This article contains persons named in the Bible, specifically in the Hebrew Bible and Old Testament, of minor notability, about whom little or nothing is known, aside from some family connections.

A

Abdeel 
Abdeel (Ab'dē el) (Hebrew עַבְדְּאֵל "servant of God"; akin to Arabic عبد الله Abdullah) is mentioned in Jeremiah 36:26 as the father of Shelemiah, one of three men who were commanded by King Jehoiakim to seize the prophet Jeremiah and his secretary Baruch. The Septuagint omits the phrase "and Shelemiah son of Abdeel", probably a scribal error due to homoioteleuton.

Abdi
The name Abdi (Hebrew עַבְדִּי) is probably an abbreviation of Obediah, meaning "servant of YHWH", according to the International Standard Bible Encyclopedia. Easton's Bible Encyclopedia, on the other hand, holds that it means "my servant". The name "Abdi" appears three times in forms of the Bible that are in use among Jews, Protestants, and Roman Catholics. There is also one additional appearance in 1 Esdras, considered canonical in Eastern Orthodox Churches.
 1 Chronicles 6:29: "And on the left hand their brethren the sons of Merari: Ethan the son of Kishi, the son of Abdi, the son of Malluch." This verse, in the King James Version and some other Bibles, is verse 44 of chapter 6.
 2 Chronicles 29:12. "Then the Levites arose, Mahath the son of Amasai, and Joel the son of Azariah, of the sons of the Kohathites; and of the sons of Merari, Kish the son of Abdi, and Azariah the son of Jehallelel; and of the Gershonites, Joah the son of Zimmah, and Eden the son of Joah."
 Ezra 10:26. "And of the sons of Elam: Mattaniah, Zechariah, and Jehiel, and Abdi, and Jeremoth, and Elijah."
 1 Esdras 9:27, where the name appears in the Hellenized form Oabd[e]ios. "Of the sons of Elam: Matthanias and Zacharias and Iezrielos and Obadios and Ieremoth and Elias."

According to Cheyne and Black (1899), the two occurrences in the Books of Chronicles refer to a single individual, and the references in Ezra and 1 Esdras are to a second individual.

Abdon
Abdon (Hebrew עַבְדּוֹן from עָבַד "to serve") is the name of four biblical individuals. It is a diminutive form of the name Ebed.
 An Abdon in the book of Judges:  see the article Abdon (Judges).
 The first-born of Gibeon of the tribe of Benjamin, mentioned only in passing in genealogies (1 Chronicles 8:30, 9:36).
 Abdon the son of Micah. Josiah sent him, among others, to the prophetess Huldah, in order to discern the meaning of the recently rediscovered book of the law (2 Chronicles 34:20). He is referred to as Achbor in 2 Kings 22:12.
 Abdon son of Sashak. He is only mentioned as a name in a genealogy (1 Chronicles 8:23).

In addition to its use as a personal name, the proper name "Abdon" is used for a Levitical city mentioned in Joshua 21:30 and 1 Chronicles 6:74 (6:59 in the New American Bible (Revised Edition)).

Abiasaph
Abiasaph (Hebrew אֲבִיאָסָף "my father has gathered") was a son of Korah of the Tribe of Levi according to Exodus 6:24, born in Egypt. Ebiasaph is a spelling variation of Abiasaph.

Abida
Abida, Abidah or Abeida, a son of Midian and descendant of Abraham and Keturah, appears twice in the Bible, in Genesis 25:4 and 1 Chronicles 1:33. The sons of Abraham's concubines were sent away to the east with gifts from Abraham. The father of Hudino, the great-grandfather of Jethro.

Abihail
Abihail may refer to one of five different people mentioned in the Bible:

 Abihail the Levite lived during the time of the wandering of the Israelites in the wilderness.  He was the head of the house of Merari and Levi's youngest son. (Numbers 3:35)
 Abihail was the wife of Abishur of the tribe of Judah. (I Chronicles 2:29)
 Abihail, from Gilead of Bashan,  was head of the tribe of Gad. (I Chronicles 5:14)
 Abihail was the daughter of David's brother Eliab. She was married to David's son Jerimoth and became mother of Rehoboam's wife Mahalath. (II Chronicles 11:18)
 Abihail  was the father of Queen Esther and uncle of Mordecai. (Esther 2:15; Esther 9:29

Abijah
Abijah (Hebrew אֲבִיָּה "my father is YHWH") is the name of seven biblical individuals:

Abijah, who married King Ahaz of Judah. She is also called Abi. Her father's name was Zechariah; she was the mother of King Hezekiah
A wife of Hezron, one of the grandchildren of Judah
 Abijah of Judah, also known as Abijam (אבים, Abiyam, "My Father is Yam [Sea]"), who was son of Rehoboam and succeeded him on the throne of Judah
 A son of Becher, the son of Benjamin
 The second son of Samuel. His conduct, along with that of his brother, as a judge in Beersheba, to which office his father had appointed him, led to popular discontent, and ultimately provoked the people to demand a monarchy.
 A descendant of Eleazar, the son of Aaron, a chief of the eighth of the twenty-four orders into which the priesthood was divided by David and an ancestor of Zechariah, the priest who was the father of John the Baptist. The order of Abijah is listed with the priests and Levites who returned with Zerubbabel son of Shealtiel and with Joshua. 
 A son of Jeroboam, the first king of Israel. On account of his severe illness when a youth, his father sent his wife to consult the prophet Ahijah regarding his recovery. The prophet, though blind with old age, knew the wife of Jeroboam as soon as she approached, and under a divine impulse he announced to her that inasmuch as in Abijah alone of all the house of Jeroboam there was found "some good thing toward the Lord", he only would come to his grave in peace. As his mother crossed the threshold of the door on her return, the youth died, and "all Israel mourned for him". According to the Jewish Encyclopedia, the good that he did "Rabbinical Literature:The passage, I Kings, xiv. 13, in which there is a reference to "some good thing [found in him] toward the Lord God of Israel," is interpreted as an allusion to Abijah's courageous and pious act in removing the sentinels placed by his father on the frontier between Israel and Judah to prevent pilgrimages to Jerusalem. Some assert that he himself undertook a pilgrimage."

This name (possibly) appeared on the Gezer Calendar, a Paleo-Hebrew inscription dating to the 9th or 10th Century BC, making it one of the earliest if not the earliest Yahwistic theophoric names outside the Bible.

Abinadab

Abinadab (Hebrew אֲבִינָדָב "my father apportions" or "the father [i.e. god of the clan] is munificent") refers to four biblical characters. Where the Hebrew text reads Avinadav, Greek manuscripts of the Septuagint read Am(e)inadab or Abin. but Brenton's translation of the Septuagint reads "Abinadab".
 A man of Kiriath-Jearim, in whose house on a hill the Ark of the Covenant was deposited after having been brought back from the land of the Philistines. "It is most likely that this Abinadab was a Levite". The ark remained in his care for twenty years, guarded by his son Eleazar (not to be confused with Eleazar, the son of Aaron), until it was at length removed by David.
 The second of the eight sons of Jesse. He was with Saul in the campaign against the Philistines in which Goliath was slain.
 One of Saul's sons, who perished with his father in the battle of Gilboa.

Abiel
Abiel (Hebrew אֲבִיאֵל "my father is God") was the name of two individuals mentioned in the Bible:
 Son of Zeror, of the tribe of Benjamin, he was the grandfather of King Saul and of his commander Abner. 1 Samuel 9
 An Arbathite, one of King David's Warriors who was known for his bravery.

Abihud
He is also called Ahihud. Another individual named Abihud is mentioned in the Gospel of Matthew as an ancestor of Jesus. But this Abihud is not listed in the Old Testament.

Abimael
In , Abimael (Hebrew אֲבִֽימָאֵ֖ל) is the ninth of the 13 sons of Joktan, a descendant of Shem. Abimael means "God is a father."

Abinoam

Abinoam was the father of Barak the partner of Deborah.

Abiram
Abiram was the name of 2 biblical individuals:

Abishua
Abishua was the name of 2 minor biblical individuals found in the Hebrew Bible.
Abishua, a High Priest of Israel, being the son of Phinehas and the father of Bukki. He is attested in several extra-biblical sources such as Flavius Josephus who suggested that Abishua succeeded his father as High Priest of Israel.
A Benjaminite. The son of Bela and the grandson of Benjamin the eponymous founder of the tribe of Benjamin.

Abishur
According to the Hebrew Bible, Abishur or Abishur ben Shammai was the spouse of Abihail, and the father of Molin and Ahban. He was directly from the tribe of Judah as the son of Shammai the son of Onam the great-great-grandson of Judah.

Abital 

In II Samuel 3:4, Abital ( ’Ăḇîṭāl) is minor biblical character in the book of Samuel and one of King David's wives. Abital gave birth to David's fifth son, Shephatiah, a minor biblical character.

Abitub
The name Abitub or Abitob appears only once in the Hebrew Bible, in 1 Chronicles 8:11, where it is used for a character said to be the son of Shaharaim, in a section on the descendants of Benjamin.

Adah
; adornment
 the first wife of Lamech, and the mother of Jabal and Jubal.
 the first wife of Esau, the daughter of Elon the Hittite. It has been suggested by biblical scholars that she is the same person as "Basemath the daughter of Elon the Hittite", mentioned as a wife of Esau in Genesis 26. She bore Esau's firstborn Eliphaz, and became the matriarch of the  Edomites.

The Order of the Eastern Star considers Adah also to be the name of the daughter of Jephthah, although the Bible does not name her.

Adalia
Adalia was slain along with his nine siblings in Susa. In various manuscripts of the Septuagint, his name is given as Barsa, Barel, or Barea.

Adbeel
Adbeel (Hebrew אַדְבְּאֵל "disciplined by God") Nadbeel or Idiba'ilu, was the third son of Ishmael out of twelve. The name Adbeel is associated with the personal name and northwest tribe in Arabia known as Idiba'ilu, whom Tiglath-Pileser conquered in the eighth century BCE. (Kenneth A. Mathews, 2005, p. 361)

Addar
Addar, according to the Hebrew Bible, was the son of Bela the son of Benjamin the eponymous founder of the tribe of Benjamin.

Adina
In , Adina (lit. Slender) is listed as one of the "mighty men" of David's army.  Adina was the son of a chief of the Reubenites named Shiza.

Adin

Adlai
Adlai is in Hebrew עַדְלָי, meaning "refuge". In , he is the father of Shaphat. He is mentioned only in this verse.

Admatha
According to one theory, the verse has suffered from scribal error, and as it originally stood Admatha was instead Hamdatha, not an adviser to Ahaseurus but the father of Haman.

Adna
Adna is the name of two biblical characters. The first is one of the men in the Book of Ezra who took foreign wives. The second is a priest, named as the head of the priestly family Harim in the time of Joiakim.

Adnah
Adnah is the name of at least two individuals in the Hebrew Bible.
 Adnah, called Ednaas or Ednas in Septuagint manuscripts, is credited with being a commander of 300,000 soldiers in the army of Jehoshaphat. He is found in 2 Chronicles 17:14. His name is spelled with a final He.
 Adnah, called Edna in the Septuagint, refers to a member of the Tribe of Manasseh who deserted Saul to support David. His name is spelled with either a final He or else a Heth, depending on the manuscript.

Adonikam
Adonikam is a Biblical figure, one of those "which came with Zerubbabel". His "children," or retainers, numbering 666, came to Jerusalem (8:13). The name means, "the Lord is risen up." In the Septuagint, depending on the manuscript and location, the name is given as Adon[e]ikam, Adonikan, Adeikam, Adenikam, Adaneikam or Adoniakaim. In , his descendants were 667 instead of the previous number 666.

Aduel
The Book of Tobit is included in some Christian Bibles, but it is not included in Bibles historically used by Jews and most Protestants. Cheyne and Black claim that "Aduel" is "no doubt another form of Adiel".

Agee
Agee was the father of Shammah, who was one of David's mighty men (II Samuel 23:11).  Based on interpretations of I Chronicles 11:34 and II Samuel 23:32–33 Agee was either the grandfather of Jonathan or his brother. According to Cheyne and Black, his name is a scribal mistake, and should read "Ela"; he is the same as the Ela mentioned in 1 Kings 4:18.

Aggaba
For the Aggaba of 1 Esdras 5:29, see Hagabah.

Ahab
Ahab (Hebrew: אָחאַב, which means "brother/father") is the name of at least two biblical figures:
 Ahab, seventh king of Israel
 Ahab, son of Koliah, who, according to Jeremiah 29:21, was labeled a false prophet by YHVH

Aharhel
In , Aharhel (Hebrew אֲחַרְחֵל "behind the rampart") is the son of Harum of the tribe of Judah.

Ahasai 
See Ahzai.

Ahasbai
Ahasbai, the son of the Maachathite, was the father of Eliphelet, one of King David's Warriors (2 Samuel 23:34).

Ahban
Ahban was the first son of Abishur and Abihail. He was also the brother of Molid and a Jerahmeelite. He is mentioned in the following passage: .

Ahi
(Hebrew אֲחִי "my brother")
 Ahi is the son of Abdiel in 1 Chronicles 5:15
 Ahi is the son of Shomer in 1 Chronicles 7:34

Ahian 
Ahian is the name given to a descendant of Manasseh in the tribal genealogies of 1 Chronicles. The name appears only in a single time in the Bible.

Ahiezer
Ahiezer the son of Ammishaddai was the leader of the tribe of Dan and one of the leaders of the tribes of Israel mentioned in several places in the Book of Numbers.

Ahilud
Ahilud is the father of Jehoshaphat, who serves as court recorder to David and Solomon. In , Ahilud is the father of Baana, an official in Solomon's court sent to gather provisions in Taanach and Megiddo, and Beth Shan.

Ahimoth 
See Mahath

Ahinadab
Ahinadab (Hebrew: אחינדב Akhinadav "my brother Is noble" or "my brother has devoted himself"), son of Iddo, is one of the twelve commissariat officers appointed by Solomon to districts of his kingdom to raise supplies by monthly rotation for his household. He was appointed to the district of Mahanaim (1 Kings 4:14), east of Jordan.

Ahiram
Ahiram was a son of Benjamin according to Numbers 26:38.

Ahisamach
Ahisamach or Ahisamakh, also Ahis'amach (Hebrew: אחיסמך "brother of support"), of the tribe of Dan, was the father of Aholiab according to Exodus 31:6, Exodus 35:34, and Exodus 38:23.

Ahishahar 
Ahishahar is the name given to a third-generation descendant of Benjamin (the eponymous forefather of the Tribe of Benjamin) in 1 Chronicles 7:10. This figure is mentioned nowhere else in the Hebrew Bible.

Ahishar
Ahishar (אחישר in Hebrew; meaning Brother of song, or singer), the officer who was "over the household" of Solomon.

Ahitub
Ahitub is the name of several minor biblical figures:
 Ahitub, son of Phinehas, grandson of Eli, and brother of Ichabod.
 Ahitub, son of Amariah and father of Zadok.
 Ahitub, a descendant through the priestly line of the first Zadok. He was an ancestor of later high priests who served during the fall of Jerusalem and after the exile.
 Ahitub, a Benjamite.

Ahlai 
Ahlai is a name given to two individuals in the Books of Chronicles. In the opinion of Thomas Kelly Cheyne, the name is probably derived from "Ahiel" or a similar name.
 The first is either the son or daughter of a Jerahmeelite man named Sheshan.
 The second is the father or mother of Zabad, who is listed as one of David's Mighty Warriors in 1 Chronicles 11:41.

Ahuzzam 
Ahuzzam or Ahuzam is the name of one of the sons of "Asshur, the father of Tekoa," in a genealogy describing the desceandants of the Tribe of Judah. He is mentioned only in 1 Chronicles 4:6.

Ahuzzath 
Ahuzzath or Ahuzzah is the name given to an associate of Abimelech, king of Gerar, in Genesis 26:26. According to the Book of Genesis, Ahuzzath accompanied Abimelech when Abimelech went to make a treaty with Isaac. He is mentioned nowhere else in the Hebrew Bible.

Ahzai 
Ahzai (KJV Ahasai) is a name which appears only in Nehemiah 11:13, where it is mentioned in passing. The verse refers to a priest, called "Amashsai son of Azarel son of Ahzai son of Meshillemoth son of Immer." In the parallel name in 1 Chronicles 9:12, the name "Jahzerah" replaces "Ahzai."

Aiah
Aiah (איה "Falcon") was the father of Rizpah, mentioned in

Aidias
Aidias, a descendant of Ela, appears in 1 Esdras 9:27 as one of the men found to have married foreign women. 1 Esdras appears in some Christian Bibles, but not in the Bibles used by Jews and most Protestants. In the parallel verse in the Book of Ezra, 10:26, the name "Elijah" is found.

Ajah
Ajah means hawk. Alternative spelling: Aiah.

Akan

In  Akan is a son of Ezer and grandson of Seir the Horite. In  he is called Jaakan.

Akkub
In , Akkub is the head of a family of Nethinim. In , Akkub is a son of  Elionenai, a descendant of Solomon living in the Kingdom of Judah.

Alemeth
Alemeth was the son of Jarah and the father of Azmaveth mentioned in  1 Chronicles 9:42.

Allon
In , Allon is the son of Jedaiah, of the family of the Simeonites, who expelled the Hamites from the valley of Gedor.

Alvah
In , Alvah is a chief of Edom and a descendant of Esau. In  he is called Aliah.

Alvan
In , Alvan is the eldest son of Shobal and a descendant of Seir the Horite. In  he is called Alian.

Amasa
In , Amasa is the son of Hadlai, and one of the leaders of Ephraim during the reign of the most wicked King Ahaz.

Amashsai 
Amashsai (Amashai in the King James Version) son of Azareel, was appointed by Nehemiah to reside at Jerusalem and do the work of the temple. He merits only one mention in the whole Bible, in Nehemiah 11:13.

Amasiah 
In 2 Chronicles 17:16, Amasiah (meaning burden of Jehovah) was the son of Zichri, a captain under King Jehoshaphat.

Amaziah
In , Amaziah is a priest of Bethel who confronts Amos and rejects his prophesying against king Jeroboam II.  As a result, Amos is led to prophesy the doom of Amaziah's family, the loss of his land and his death in exile.  Jonathan Magonet has described Amaziah as 'a spiritual leader who believed in his own power and could not risk hearing the word of God'.

Ammihud

An Ephraimite. The son of Laadan (son of Tahan, son of Telah, son of Resheph, son of Rephah, son of Beriah, son of Joseph) and father of Elishama (father of Nun, father of Joshua).

Amminadib 
It is rendered in the margin "my willing people," and in the Revised Version "my princely people."

Ammizabad 
Ammizabad was the son of Benaiah, who was the third and chief captain of the host under David (1 Chronicles 27:6).

Amon
Amon (Hebrew: אמן  'Amon) was a city governor in the time of Kings Jehoshaphat and Ahab

Amzi
Amzi ('am-tsee') is a masculine Hebrew name meaning "my strength" or "strong."  Two individuals with this name are mentioned in the Bible:
  indicates Amzi as a Levite man of the family of Merari.
 A son of Zechariah was named Amzi.  He was an ancestor to the Levite priest Adaiah, who was one of the Israelite exiles under the direction of Nehemiah when he returned to Jerusalem to rebuild the city walls.

Anah
In the Book of Genesis, there are two men and one woman named Anah.
 In , Anah is a daughter of Zibeon, and her daughter Aholibamah is a wife of Esau.

Anaiah 
Anaiah, a name meaning "Yahweh has answered," appears only twice in the Hebrew Bible, with both appearances in Nehemiah. The first appearance describes Ezra, a Jewish reformer, standing up to give a speech, with thirteen other people standing beside him. Anaiah is listed as one of those standing by. The second appearance of the name is in a list of people who signed a covenant between God and the Jewish people.

Anak
Anak was the father of Ahiman, Sheshai, and Talmai in Numbers 13:22

Anan
Anan was one of the Israelites who sealed the covenant after the return from Babylon. While "Anan" (which means "Cloud") never became a very common name, a much later person so named – Anan Ben David (c. 715 – c. 795) is widely considered to be a major founder of the Karaite movement of Judaism.

Anani 
Anani is a name which appears in a genealogy in Chronicles. It refers to a descendant of Zerubbabel. According to the Masoretic Text Anani was born six generations after Zerubbabel. For scholars, this six-generation span after Zerubbabel is the terminus a quo for the date of Chronicles—it implies that Chronicles could not have been written earlier than about 400 BCE. In the Septuagint, Anani is listed as eleven generations removed from Zerubbabel. For scholars who believe that the Septuagint reading for Anani's genealogy is correct, this places the earliest possible date for the writing of Chronicles at about 300 BCE.

Ananiah 
Ananiah was the father of Maaseiah the father of Azariah was mentioned in the Book of Nehemiah specifically .

Anath 
Anath, being described in the Hebrew Bible, was the father of Shamgar, a judge of Israel who slew the Philistines with just using an ox goad. He is mentioned Judges 3:31 and 5:6.

Anthothijah 
Anthothijah is a name which appears only once in the Hebrew Bible, in a genealogical section listing descendants of Benjamin. It is most likely an adjective used to describe a female person from the town of Anathoth. Manuscripts of the Greek Septuagint give the name as Anothaith, Anathothia, Athein, or Anathotha.

Aphiah
Aphiah, of the tribe of Benjamin, was an ancestor of King Saul and of his commander Abner. According to Saul, his family was the least of the tribe of Benjamin. A son of Shchorim, the son of Uzziel (descendant of Gera, son of Benjamin) and Matri (ancestor of Matrites and descendant of Belah, son of Benjamin).

Appaim 
Appaim is a minor figure who appears in 1 Chronicles 2:30 and 31. He appears briefly in a genealogy of Jerahmeelites, in which he is the father Ishi, son of Appaim, son of Nadab, son of Shammai, son of Onam, son of Jerahmeel. In manuscripts of the Septuagint, he is called Ephraim, Aphphaim, or Opheim.

Arah 
Arah is the name of two minor biblical figures. The name may mean "wayfarer."
 Arah the son of Ulla appears as a member of the Tribe of Asher in the part of the Books of Chronicles devoted to outlining the genealogy of the twelve Tribes of Israel.
 In the Book of Ezra and the Book of Nehemiah, the "sons of Arah" are a group listed among the returnees to Jerusalem in the time of Nehemiah. Shechaniah, a "son of Shecaniah," was the father-in law of Tobiah the Ammonite.

Ard
Ard (Hebrew ארד) was the tenth son of Benjamin in Genesis 46:21.  It is relatively unusual among Hebrew names for ending in a cluster of two consonants instead of as a segholate.

Ardon
Ardon (ארדון "Bronze") a son of Caleb by Jerioth, 1st Chronicles 2:18

Areli
Areli was a son of Gad according to  Genesis 46:16 and Numbers 26:17. He was one of the 70 souls to migrate to Egypt with Jacob.

Argob

Arieh 
Arieh was the name of one of the officers of King Pekahiah of the house of Manahen when Pekah the son of Remaliah went against the king.

Ariel 

Arnan
Arnan was a descendant of David, father of  Obadiah, and son of Rephaiah.

Arodi
Arodi or Arod was a son of Gad according to  Genesis 46:16 and Numbers 26:17. He was one of the 70 souls to migrate to Egypt with Jacob.

Asareel 
Asareel, according to a genealogical passages in the Book of Chronicles, was the son of a figure named Jehaleleel or Jehallelel. Asareel and Jehaleleel are mentioned only briefly, in a section of the genealogies adjacent to the descendants of Caleb, although the relationship between them and the descendants of Caleb is uncertain.

Ashbel
Ashbel (Hebrew, אשבל) is the third of the ten sons of Benjamin named in Genesis. He founded the tribe of Ashbelites.

Ashpenaz
It was Ashpenaz who gave Daniel and his companions the names Belteshazzar, Shadrach, Meshach and Abed-Nego.

Asiel 
Asiel is listed as one of the descendants of Simeon in 1 Chronicles 4:35. In the deuterocanonical Tobit 1:1, Tobit's family are descendants of Asiel, of the tribe of Naphtali.

Asriel
Asriel was a son of Manasseh according to Numbers 26:31, Joshua 17:2, and 1 Chronicles 7:14.

Assir 
There are 2 biblical individuals named Assir:
A son of Korah of the house of Levi according to Exodus 6:24, born in Egypt.  It was also the firstborn son of Jehoiachin, King of Judah. Perhaps there is enough ambiguity here to assume that "Assir" is actually an adjective.  The text is too vague to be certain... i.e. 1 Chronicles 3:17.  Jehoiachin was the last free king of Judah before being led off to captivity... "prisoner" could be a more descriptive use of "Assir" as opposed to the name of a son.  Maybe. According to 1 Chronicles 6 he was the son of Abiasaph instead of being the son of Korah.
The firstborn of King Jehoiachin from the tribe of Judah. He is mentioned briefly in 1 Chronicles 3:17 at the time of the Babylonian exile in 587/6 BC.

Atarah
Atarah was the wife of Jerahmeel the son of Hezron according to 1 Chronicles 2:26, and was the mother of Onam, and the step-mother of Jerahmeel's firstborns.

Ater
Ater was the name of 2 or possibly 1 biblical individuals in the time of the Babylonian exile.
The head of his 98 descendants who came with Zerubbabel from Babylon. The King James Version translates his name as Ater of Hezekiah while the Revised Edition of 1 Esdras 5:15 has Ater of Ezekias, margin, "Ater of Hezekiah." the King James Version has "Aterezias." The name also appears in ((), possibly another Ater, but could be the same of number 1.

Athaiah 
Athaiah the son of Uzziah is a person listed in Nehemiah as a Judahite inhabitant of Jerusalem. The meaning of the name is uncertain.

Athlai 
Athlai, a descendant of Bebai, is listed in the book of Ezra as one of the men who married foreign women. The name is a contraction of "Athaliah." In the equivalent list in 1 Esdras, the name "Amatheis" or "Ematheis" appears in the same place.

Attai 
Attai was the name of 2 biblical individuals:
The son of Jarha and one of the daughters of Sheshan who had no sons but had daughters.

Azaliah 
Azaliah is mentioned in passing as the father of the scribe Shaphan in 2 Kings 22:3 and the copy of the same verse found in 2 Chronicles 34:8. The name means "Yahweh has reserved."

Azaniah 
Azaniah is mentioned in passing in Nehemiah 10:9 (10 in some Bibles) as the name the father of Levite who signed the covenant of Nehemiah. The name means "Yahweh listened."

Azarel 
Azarel (Hebrew: עֲזַרְאֵל), Azareel, or Azarael was the name of 6 biblical individuals found in the Hebrew Bible:
A Korahite individual who was on of the mighty men, helpers of the war who came to David to Ziklag. He along with other warriors were described as having armed with arrows.
A musician who played in the temple
The son of Jeroham and the leader over the Tribe of Dan of the hosts of David mentioned in 
The father of Amashai a priest after the exile and the son Ahzai in 
An associate of the priest who played the trumpets in the procession when the walls were dedicated.

Azariah 
Azariah (Hebrew – עזריהו azaryahu "God Helped"). There are 22 biblical figures named Azariah 

 Abednego, the new name given to Azariah who is the companion of Daniel, Hananiah, and Mishael in the Book of Daniel
 Azariah the father of Amariah and the son of Meraioth, could possibly be a High Priest since his father and sons are High Priests too.
 Azariah (prophet), a prophet
 Azariah (high priest) high priest of Israel
 Azariah II, another high priest, in the reign of Uzziah
 Uzziah, King of Judah, also known as Azariah
 Azariah the son of Nathan in charge of the district officers with Zabud one of the mighty soldiers of David, Solomon's father was the personal adviser of Solomon.
Jeremiah describes them as being proud.
 Azariah the son of Uzziah or Zephaniah and an ancestor of Samuel.
He is also called Seraiah.
 One of the sons of King Jehoshaphat, he was probably one of the brothers that King Jehoram killed.
 Another son of King Jehoshaphat, he is also called Azariahu in the NIV Bible.
 One of the Levites who instructed the people in the Law while the people were standing there.
Two "commanders of the hundreds" who formed part of Jehoiada's campaign to restore the kingship to Joash in 2 Chronicles 23: Azariah, son of Jeroham and Azariah son of Obed.

Azel

Azgad 
Azgad is the name of a Levite who signed Ezra's covenant. The name means "Gad is strong."

Aziel 
See Jaaziel.

Azmaveth
Azmaveth of Baharim was one of David's mighty warriors mentioned in 2 Samuel 23:31, and father of Jeziel and Pelet according to 1 Chronicles 12:3. In 1 Chronicles 27:25, Azmaveth the son of Adiel is mentioned as responsible for the king's treasuries.

Azrikam
Azrikam was the name of 3 biblical individuals

A son of Neariah and a descendant of Zerubbabel.
One of the six sons of Azel in 1 Chronicles 8:38.

Azur
See #Azzur

Azzan
Azzan (Hebrew עַזָּן "strong") was the father of Paltiel, a prince of the Tribe of Issachar. (Num. 34:26).

Azzur
Azzur was the name of 3 biblical individuals named in the Hebrew Bible.
The father of the false prophet Hananiah, who disputes Jeremiah's prophecy. Hananiah's death was predicted by Jeremiah, and later, in 2 months the prediction was fulfilled. Also called Azur
The father of Jaazeniah, one of the princes who gave a wicked counsel to the city of Jerusalem. His name may also be translated as Azur in the King James Version.

B

Baanah 

(Hebrew: בַעֲנָא)
 One of Ish-bosheth's army captains (2 Samuel 4:2)
 Baanah the Netophathite was the father of Heleb, one of King David's Warriors (2 Samuel 23:29, 1 Chronicles 11:30).
 Baanah the son of Ahilud, was one of Solomon's twelve regional administrators, having jurisdiction over Taanach, Meggido, and Beth-shean (1 Kings 4:12).
 Baanah the son of Hushai, was one of Solomon's twelve regional administrators, having jurisdiction over Asher and Aloth (1 Kings 4:16).

Baara
Baara was one of the three wives of Shaharaim, according to 1 Chronicles 8:8.

Baaseiah
Baaseiah (Hebrew:באשעיה Meaning: the Lord is bold) was a Gershonite Levite as the son of Michael and the father of Malkijah according . He was also an ancestor of Asaph the seer or poet.

Bakbakkar
Bakbakkar, according to the Hebrew Bible, was a Levite dwelling in the villages of the Netophathites, and later carried captive into Babylon. He is also one of the descendants of Asaph.

Barachel

Barachel was a Buzite, and was the father of Elihu, an antagonist of Job, according to Job 32:2.

Barkos
Barkos was a painter who was the father of some of the Nethinim, according to Ezra 2:53.

Barzillai
Barzillai [ברזלי "Iron-like"] the Gileadite of Rogelim was 80 years old at the time of Absalom's revolt against King David. Barzillai supplied provisions for David's army at Mahanaim (2 Samuel 17:27–29). After the death of Absalom, being an old man, he was unable to accompany the king back to Jerusalem, but brought Chimham to David for the return journey (2 Samuel 19:31–37).

Another figure who married one of Barzillai's daughters was called Barzellai as a result (Ezra 2:61; Nehemiah 7:63). In 1 Esdras 5:38, he is called Zorzelleus.

Basemath
Hebrew: Sweet-smelling or Sweet-smile
 Basemath, wife of Esau, and daughter of Elon the Hittite. She is thought to be identical to or a sister to Adah who is mentioned in Genesis 36.
 Basemath, another wife of Esau, daughter of Ishmael, sister to Nebajoth and mother of Reuel. She is thought by some scholars to be the same as Mahalath of Genesis 28.
 Basemath, the daughter of Solomon; a wife of Ahimaaz.

Becher
Becher was the name of two individuals mentioned in the Bible:
 The second of ten sons of Benjamin according to Genesis 46:21 and 1 Chronicles 7:6
 A son of Ephraim according to Numbers 26:35.  His descendants were referred to as Bachrites.

Becorath
Becorath, son of Aphiah, of the tribe of Benjamin, was an ancestor of King Saul and of his commander Abner. According to Saul, his family was the least of the tribe of Benjamin. (1 Samuel 9)

Beker
See Becher.

Bela
Hebrew: בלע BeLa "Crooked"Bela was the name of three individuals mentioned in the Bible:
 Bela ben Beor, an Edomite king according to Genesis 36:32 and 1 Chronicles 1:43
 (also "Belah") The first of ten sons of Benjamin according to Genesis 46:21, Numbers 26:38, and 1 Chronicles 7 and 8.
 A son of Azaz according to 1 Chronicles 5:8

Ben AbinadabBen Abinadab (Hebrew בנ אבינדב BeN ,'aḄYNaDaḄ "My Father is Liberal"), was one of King Solomon's twelve regional administrators; he was over Dor, and he was married to Taphath, a daughter of Solomon. I Kings 4:11 (RSV).

Ben-AmmiBen-Ammi (Hebrew בן־עמי for "son of my people") was the son of Lot and his youngest daughter. He became the father of the Ammonites (see ).

Ben DekerBen Dekar (Hebrew בנ דקר BeN DeQeR "Son of Pick"), was one of King Solomon's twelve regional administrators; he was over Makaz, Shaalbim, Beth-shemesh, and Elon-beth-hanan. I Kings 4:9 (RSV).

Ben GeberBen Geber (Hebrew בנ גבר BeN GeḄeR "Son of He-Man"), was one of King Solomon's twelve regional administrators; he was responsible for Ramoth-Gilead and Argob (1 Kings 4:13).

Ben HesedBen Hesed (Hebrew בנ חסד ben hesed "Son of Grace"), was one of King Solomon's twelve regional administrators; he was over Aruboth, Sochoh, and Hepher. I Kings 4:10 (RSV).

Ben HurBen Hur (Hebrew בנ חור Ben Hur "Son of Hur") was one of King Solomon's twelve regional administrators; he was over Ephraim. I Kings 4:8 (RSV).

BenoBeno was the son of Merari and from Jaaziah 1 Chronicles 24:26–27.

 Beriah Beriah is the name of four different biblical individuals:
 One of Asher's four sons, and father of Heber and Malchiel.
 A son of Ephraim, born after the killing of Ephraim's sons Ezer and Elead, and so called by his father "because disaster had befallen his house." He was the father of Rephah, the ancestor of Joshua son of Nun son of Elishama.
 A Benjamite, son of Elpaal. He and his brother Shema expelled the Gittites, and were patriarchs to the inhabitants of Ajalon. His sons were Michael, Ishpah and Joha.
 A Levite, the son of Shimei. He was jointly patriarch of a clan with his brother Jeush.

He is also a Jerahmeelite.

BidkarBidkar (Hebrew: בדקר) was an officer of the Israelite king Jehu.  Jehu ordered Bidkar to throw the body of the king he usurped, Jehoram, into the field of Naboth, fulfilling prophecy.  II Kings 9:25

Bigvai
The name Bigvai occurs several times in Ezra-Nehemiah (Ezra 2:2, 14, 8:14, Nehemiah 7:7, 19 and 10:16). In the last of these he is one of the "leaders of the people". By 408 B.C. the Elephantine papyri show that Sanballat was the governor of Samaria, and Bigvai the governor of Jerusalem but Wright says that "it is not suggested that any of these [referred to in Ezra-Nehemiah] is the man who later became governor.

BilgahBilgah was allocated the fifteenth division of priestly service when lots were drawn in 1 Chronicles 24.

BilshanBilshan, one of the important men who came with Zerubbabel from Babylon. In 1 Esdras 5:8 he is called Beelsarus. According to Rabbinical Literature, the name Bilshan is improper, but a surname to the preceding name Mordecai. The latter was given this epithet because of his linguistic attainments.

BineaBinea was the son of Moza and the father of Rephaiah or Rapha. He is mentioned in two passages: 1 Chronicles 8:37 and 1 Chronicles 9:43.

BirshaBirsha is the king of Gomorrah in Genesis 14 who joins other Canaanite city kings in rebelling against Chedorlaomer.

BocheruBocheru was one of the 6 sons of Azel. He is mentioned two times in the Hebrew Bible: 1 Chronicles 8:38 and 1 Chronicles 9:44.

BukkiBukki was a prince of the tribe of Dan; one of those appointed by Moses to superintend the division of Canaan amongst the tribe (Num. 34:22).

BunahBunah is mentioned in 1 Chronicles 2:25 as a son of Jerahmeel.

C

Calcol
See Chalcol

Caleb, son of Hezron
This is about the Caleb mentioned only in 1 Chronicles 2:18. For the better-known Caleb son of Jephunneh, see Caleb.

See Caleb (son of Hezron).

CarmiCarmi refers to two individuals mentioned in the Bible:
 The fourth son of Reuben according to Genesis 46:9, Numbers 26:6, and 1 Chronicles 5:3.
 The son of Zabdi, grandson of Zerah of the Tribe of Judah, and the father of Achan, according to Joshua 7:1. He was present at the Battle of Jericho.

 Carshena Carshena or Karshena is a name which appears in a list of high-ranking officials in the court of king Ahasuerus in Esther 1:14. It is derived from the Persian warkačīnā, meaning "wolfish".

ChalcolChalcol, the brother of Darda (Hebrew כלכל kalkol – the same consonants with different vowel points (kilkayl) mean "maintain") is listed in 1 Kings 4:31 as an example of a very wise man who is, nevertheless, not as wise as Solomon. Another person with the same Hebrew name (though spelled Calcol in the King James Version) is listed in 1 Chronicles as the son of Zerah, the son of Judah (son of Jacob).

 Chelal 
See Kelal.

 Chelluh Chelluh, Cheluhi, or Cheluhu is the name given in Ezra 10:35 for one of the men who married foreign women.

 Chelub 
Two individuals by the name of Chelub are mentioned in the Hebrew Bible.
 A descendant of Judah, called "brother of Shuhah" in 1 Chronicles 4:11, in a genealogical passage listing descendants of Judah. According to the Encyclopaedia Biblica (1899), this "Chelub" is the biblical figure better known as Caleb.
 An Ezri son of Chelub was an overseer of agricultural work in the time of king David according to 1 Chronicles 27:26.

 Chesed 
See Kesed

 Chenaanah Chenaanah is the name of two biblical figures.
 In a genealogical section of Chronicles concerned with the Tribe of Benjamin, a Chenaanah son of Bilhan is mentioned.
 The false prophet Zedekiah is called "son of Chenaanah".

 Chenaniah Chenaniah, according to Chronicles, was a Levite leader in the time of David. The Hebrew text is unclear as to whether he was in charge of something to do with singing or with the carrying of the ark.

ChimhamChimham, Chimhan  or Kimham  was a servant nominated by Barzillai to accompany King David to Gilgal during his return to Jerusalem after the death of Absalom. (2 Samuel 19:37–40)

The name also refers to a place near Bethlehem where Johanan regrouped before departing to Egypt.

ChislonChislon was the father of Elidad, a prince of the Tribe of Benjamin. (Num. 34:21)

CushiCushi was the name of 2 biblical individuals found in the Hebrew Bible.
The father of Shelemiah, and so as the great-grandfather of Jehudi who later joined Jeremiah and Baruch in the request of the men to read the scrolls of Jeremiah to the king's direct advisors. Some point afterwards, Jehoiachim demolishes the scroll by casting it to a pit of fire.

Shortly after David mourns for his beloved son which caused Joab to be taken off his position.
The King James Version translates his name as Cushi as a term for an ethiopian descent.

D

DalphonDalphon (Hebrew דַּלְפוֹן "to weep") was one of the ten sons of Haman, killed along with Haman by the Jews of Persia, according to Esther 9:7.

DardaDarda (Hebrew דַּרְדַּע) was one of the exemplars of wisdom than whom Solomon was wiser. In 1 Chronicles 2:6, his name is misspelled as "Dara."

Daughter of Machir

 Delaiah Delaiah ( "drawn out by YHWH"). is the name of several biblical persons:
 Kohenic family, one of the Twenty-four Priestly divisions
 Son of Shemaiah, and officer to King Jehoiakim of Judah. He was one of the officers present at the delivery of a scroll sent by Jeremiah, and one of those who asked the king not to burn the scroll. (ibid. )
 The head of a family that came up from the Babylonian exile with Zerubbabel, that was unable to give its ancestral genealogy.
One of the sons of Elioenai, a descendant of the royal Davidic line through Jeconiah.. He lived after the exile and was a descendant of Zerubbabel as a 3x great-grandson.
 Son of Mehetabel and father of Shemaiah. He is probably identical to the previous entry.

DeuelDeuel (Hebrew דְּעוּאֵל) was the father of Eliasaph the leader of the Tribe of Gad, as noted in four verses in the Book of Numbers:  Numbers 1:14; 7:42,47; 10:20. However, in Numbers 2:14 this Eliasaph is called "the son of Reuel."

DiblaimDiblaim (Hebrew דִּבְלָיִם "cakes of pressed figs") was the father of the prophet Hosea's wife, Gomer. His name means 'doubled cakes'. (Hosea 1:3)

Dibri
Dibri, a Danite, was the father of Shelomith, according to Leviticus 24:11. Shelomith's son was stoned to death by the people of Israel for blasphemy following Moses' issue of a ruling on the penalty to be applied for blasphemy.

Diklah
Diklah was a son of Joktan according to Genesis 10:27, 1 Chronicles 1:21.

 Dodavahu Dodavahu or Dodavah, according to Chronicles, was the father of Eliezer, a prophet.

DishanDishan (Hebrew דִּישׁוֹן dishon) was the youngest son of Seir the Horite. (Genesis 36:21)

Dodo
Dodo (Hebrew דּוֹדוֹ dodo "his beloved" or "his uncle" from דּוֹד dod meaning "beloved" or "father's brother") is a name given to three persons in the Bible:
 A descendant of Issachar (Judges 10:1).
 An Ahohite, father of Eleazar, who was one of David's three mighty men who were over the thirty. (2 Samuel 23:9; 1 Chronicles 11:12)
 A man from Bethlehem, and father of Elhanan, who was one of David's thirty heroes (2 Samuel 23:24).

E

Ebed
 The father of Gaal, mentioned in Judges 9.
 The son of Jonathan, one of the heads of household who returned from the Babylonian exile in the Book of Ezra (Ezra 1:6).

Ebed-melechEbed-melech (Hebrew: עבד-מלך  "servant of a king"), an Ethiopian eunuch, intervened with king Zedekiah on behalf of Jeremiah

EberEber was the name of 5 biblical individuals of the Hebrew Bible.
The third generation from Shem and the founder of the hebrew race. The son of Salah and the father of Peleg. His named can be derived from the term hebrew. 
A benjaminite and one of the heads of the families of the tribe in Jerusalem. v.22
A head of the family of Amok after the exile.

Ebiasaph
See Abiasaph

EderEder was a Benjaminite chief (Ader in the King James Version) (1 Chronicles 8:15)

EglahEglah was one of David's wives and the mother of Ithream, according to II Samuel 3:4.

Ehi
In , Ehi is the third son of Benjamin. In  he is called Aharah, and in  he is called Ahiram.

EkerEker was one of the sons of Ram the firstborn son of Jerahmeel the brother of Ram.

Elah
 Elah was the father of King Hoshea of Israel (2 Kings 17:1, 18:1)
 Elah was the name of an Edomite clan (possibly the name of an eponymous chieftain) mentioned in Genesis 36:31–43.

ElasahElasah or Eleasah (Hebrew: אלעשה meaning 'made by God') was the name of four individuals mentioned in the Bible:
 The son of Shaphan, who was chosen by King Zedekiah of Judah to be one of the two messengers to take Jeremiah's letter to Nebuchadnezzar (Jeremiah 29:3)  He was probably the brother of Ahikam, who had taken Jermiah's part at the time of his arrest after the temple sermon 
 One of the sons of Pashur who was rebuked for marrying a foreign woman (Ezra 10:18–19)
 The son of Helez, a Jerahmeelite (1 Chronicles 2:39–40). He is called "Eleasah" in the King James Bible.
 A descendant of Saul according to 1 Chronicles 8:37. He is called "Eleasah" in the King James Bible.

 Eldaah Eldaah appears as one of the sons of Midian (son of Abraham) in Genesis 25:4 and 1 Chronicles 1:33.

 Elead Elead appears in 1 Chronicles 7:21 as the name of a man who, along with his brother Ezer, is killed by farmers near Philistine the city of Gath. It is unclear whether Elead is intended by the Chronicler as the son or a later descendant of Ephraim, and it is likewise uncertain whether this Elead is the same figure as the Eleadah mentioned in the previous verse.

 Eleasah 
See Elasah.

 Eliada Eliada (rendered once as Eliadah by the King James Bible) is the name of three individuals in the Hebrew Bible.
 The son of David, who was originally called Beeliada.
 A Benjamite captain in the time of king Jehoshaphat.
 The father of Rezon the Syrian, spelled "Eliadah" in the King James Version.

Eliadah
See Eliada.

Eliezer
Eliezer, son of Dodavahu
See Dodavahu

 Eliphal Eliphal son of Ur is listed as one of David's Mighty Warriors in 1 Chronicles 11:35. In the corresponding place in Samuel's version of the list (2 Samuel 23:34), he is called "Eliphelet son of Ahasbai the Maachathite." According to the Encyclopaedia Biblica, the name "Eliphal" (Hebrew lypl ) is copyist's error for "Eliphelet" ( lyplt ) caused by dropping the final letter in the name.Ancient Hebrew, in general, did not include vowels. For a more thorough description, see Hebrew alphabet.

 Eliphelet Eliphelet is a Hebrew name meaning "God is a deliverance."
 It is the name of several figures in the Hebrew Bible, and appears under several spellings.The spellings Elpalet, Elpelet, Eliphal, Eliphalet, and Eliphalat appear in English Bibles. In manuscripts of the Greek Septuagint, the spellings Aleiphaleth, Aleiphat, Eleiphaath, Eleiphala, Eleiphalat, Eleiphalet, Eleiphaleth, Eleiphaneth, Eleiphal, Eliaphalet, Eliphaad, Eliphaal, Eliphaath, Eliphael, Eliphala, Eliphalad, Eliphalat, Eliphalatos, Eliphaleis, Eliphalet, Eliphath, Elphadat, Elphalat, Elphat, Emphalet, and Ophelli occur. For the exact manuscripts and passages where these names appear, see the Encyclopaedia Biblica article for "Eliphelet."
 Eliphelet is the name given to a son of David in 2 Samuel 5:16, and 1 Chronicles 3:8 and 14:7.  Due to a textual error, Chronicles records Eliphelet twice, as if it were the name of two different sons of David.
 Eliphal, son of Ur (2 Samuel 23:34) or Ahasbai (1 Chronicles 11:35), is listed as one of David's Mighty Warriors. The Encyclopaedia Biblica claims that "Eliphal" is likely a scribal error for "Eliphelet."
 Eliphal son of Eshek appears in a genealogy of the Tribe of Benjamin (1 Chronicles 8:39).
 An Eliphelet is named among the "descendants of Adonikam," one of the groups that returned with Ezra from the Babylonian captivity according to Ezra 8:13.
 An Eliphelet, one of the "descendants of Hashum," is listed as one of the men who married foreign women according to Ezra 10:33.

EliasaphEliasaph was the name of two individuals mentioned in the Bible:
 The son of Deuel, the prince of the Tribe of Gad and one of the leaders of the tribes of Israel, according to Numbers 1:14 and Numbers 10:20.
 The son of Lael and the chief of the house of Gershon according to Numbers 3:24.

 Eliathah Eliathah is the name given in 1 Chronicles 25:4 to one of the "fourteen sons" of Heman. According to 25:27, he gave his name to one of the twenty-four classes of temple singers.

ElidadElidad was a prince of the tribe of Benjamin; one of those appointed by Moses to superintend the division of Canaan amongst the tribe (Numbers 34: 21).

 Elienai Elienai, one of the nine sons of Shimei, appears in a genealogical passage as a descendant of Benjamin in 1 Chronicles 8:20. The consonants which make up the Hebrew name are only in this one passage read as Elienai; elsewhere the pronunciation is Elioenai.

ElihorephElihoreph (Hebrew אליחרף) was a scribe in King Solomon's court. He was a son of Shisha and brother of Ahiah.  (I Kings: 4:3) The name means "'my God repays,' or 'my God is the giver of the autumn harvest.'"

ElijahElijah (Hebrew: אליה) was the name of three minor biblical individuals beside from the famous prophet Elijah.
One of the descendants of the Harim, of the tribe of Levi who had married strange wives in the guiltiness of intermarriage.
A descendant of Elam, of the priestly line who is also listed as being guilty of intermarriage in Ezra 10:26.

ElimelechElimelech was the husband of Naomi. Together they had two sons, Mahlon and Chilion. He was originally a resident of Bethlehem before moving to Moab with his family, where he died (see ).  All of his property was later purchased by Boaz (see ).

 Elioenai Elioenai is the name of several minor persons found in the Hebrew Bible.
 An Elioenai appears in 1 Chronicles 3:23–24: the son of Neariah, the son of Shemaiah, the son of Shecaniah, a descendant of king Jeconiah.
 A clan leader in the Tribe of Simeon, according to 1 Chronicles 4:36.
 Elioenai son of Becher, a descendant of the Tribe of Benjamin according 1 Chronicles 7:8.
 A descendant of Pashhur, one of the priests listed as having married foreign women (Ezra 10:22).
 A descendant of Zattu, also listed with those who had foreign wives (Ezra 10:27).
 A priest involved in the dedication of the wall of Jerusalem according to Nehemiah 12:41. This may be the same as the descendant of Passhur (above).
 Elioenai or Elihoenai, son of Meshelemiah, son of Korah (1 Chronicles 26:3).
 Elioenai or Elionenai was a descendant of David. He was the father of Akkub, and son of Neariah.

ElishamaElishama (Hebrew: אלישמע my God heard) was the name of several biblical characters, including:
 Elishama, a son of Ammihud, a prince of the house of Ephraim and one of the leaders of the tribes of Israel, according to Numbers 1:10.
 Elishama the scribe (Jeremiah 36:12)
 Elishama, son of David, born in Jerusalem, mentioned in the second Book of Samuel

ElishaphatElishaphat, son of Zichri, was one of the "captains of hundreds" associated with Jehoiada in restoring king Jehoash to the throne .

ElishebaElisheba ("God is my oath", cognate to the name Elizabeth) is the wife of Aaron and sister-in-law of Moses.  Her sons were Nadab, Abihu, Eleazer and Ithamar. (Exodus 6:23).

ElizaphanElizaphan was a prince of the tribe of Zebulun; one of those appointed by Moses to superintend the division of Canaan amongst the tribe (Num. 34:25).

ElizurElizur was a son of Shedeur and a prince of the House of Reuben according to Numbers 1:5, and one of the leaders of the tribes of Israel. He appears only in the Book of Numbers, in five verses (1:5; 2:10; 7:30, 35; 10:18).

 Elnaam Elnaam, according to 1 Chronicles 11:46, was the father of Jeribai and Joshaviah, two of David's Mighty Warriors.

ElnathanElnathan  (Hebrew אלנתן Elnathan "God gave") is a Hebrew name found in 2 Kings, Jeremiah and Ezra.

Nehushta was the mother of king Jeconiah, whose father was king Jehoiakim. Despite this close relationship to the king, Elnathan is one of those who, according to  opposes Jehoiakim when he cuts up and burns a scroll that had been brought to him, containing Jeremiah's prophesies of the forthcoming destruction of Judah. Elnathan's father Achbor was a strong supporter of the earlier reforms of king Josiah, which may have influenced Elnathan's behavior, although according to  he had earlier been closely involved in the persecution of the prophet Uriah ben Shemaiah.

In , the name Elnathan occurs three times:
Then sent I for Eliezer, for Ariel, for Shemaiah, and for Elnathan, and for Jarib, and for Elnathan, and for Nathan, and for Zechariah, and for Meshullam, chief men; also for Joiarib, and for Elnathan, which were teachers. (Revised Version)
According to Donna Laird, the repetition of Elnathan, and the similarity between the names Jarib and Joiarib, may indicate a copyist's accidental repetition.

ElonElon was the name of two individuals mentioned in the Bible:
 A son of Zebulun according to  Genesis 46:14 and Numbers 26:26. He was one of the 70 souls to migrate to Egypt with Jacob.
 Elon, one of the judges of Israel.

 Elpaal Elpaal is a name mentioned briefly in 1 Chronicles 8, in a genealogy of the Tribe of Benjamin. He is recorded as the son of a woman named Hushim, the wife of a man named Shaharaim. The relationship between Shaharaim and Benjamin is not spelled out by the Chronicler. Elpaal is recorded as the father of people who included the builders or ancestors of the towns of Ono, Lod, and Ajalon.

 Elpalet 
See Eliphelet (biblical figure)

 Elpelet 
See Elpelet

 Eluzai Eluzai, in 1 Chronicles 12:6, is the name of a Benjamite warrior who joined the forces of David at Ziklag. The name may have meant "God is my refuge."

 Elzabad Elzabad is the name of two biblical figures.
 Elzabad appears ninth in a list of eleven warriors from the Tribe of Gad who, according to 1 Chronicles 12:12, joined forces with David "at the stronghold in the wilderness."
 Elzabad, the son of Shemaiah, the son of Obed-edom, is listed as a Korahite porter in 1 Chronicles 26:7.

ElzaphanElzaphan was a son of Uzziel of the house of Levi according to Exodus 6:22, born in Egypt. He was a nephew of Amram and a cousin of Aaron, Miriam, and Moses. He and Mishael were asked by Moses to carry away Nadab's and Abihu's bodies to a place outside the camp. (Leviticus 10:4). In the wilderness of Sinai he was named chief of the house of Kohath (Numbers 3:30).

EnanEnan is mentioned several by way of reference to his son, "Ahira the son of Enan," who according to the Book of Numbers was the tribal leader of the Tribe of Naphtali in the time of the wilderness wanderings following the Exodus.

Enoch

In , Enoch is the firstborn son of Cain and the father of Irad. Cain named the city of Enoch after his son.

Enan
For the place-name containing Enan, see Hazar Enan.Enan was a member of the house of Naphtali according to Numbers 1:15. He was the father of Ahira.

 Ephlal Ephlal is the name given to a Jerahmeelite found a genealogy in 1 Chronicles. He is identified as the son of Zabad, the son of Nathan, the son of Attai, the son of Jarha, the son-in-law of Sheshan, the son of Ishi, the son of Appaim, the son of Nadab, the son of Shammai, the son of Onam, the son of Jerahmeel. In various manuscripts of the Greek Septuagint, the name is found in the forms Aphamel, Aphamed, and Ophlad. Stanley Arthur Cook (1899) suggested that the name might originally have been either an abbreviated form of Eliphelet, or else the name "Elpaal."

EphodEphod was the father of Hanniel, a prince of the Tribe of Manasseh. (Num. 34:23).

EphronEphron the Hittite, son of Zohar, lived in Mamre among the children of Heth. Abraham comes to the Hittites, which are strangers to him, and asks them to sell him a property that he can use as a burial site. The Hittites, flattering Abraham by calling him a mighty prince says that he can choose whichever tomb he wants. Abraham then asks them to contact Ephron son of Zohar who owns the cave of Machpelah which he is offering to buy for "the full price". Ephron slyly replies that he is prepared to give Abraham the field and the cave within in, knowing that that would not result in Abraham having a permanent claim of it. Abraham politely refuses the offer and insists on paying for the field. Ephron replies that the field is worth four hundred shekels of silver and Abraham agrees to the price without any further bargaining. He then proceeded to bury his dead wife Sarah there.

ErEr (Hebrew: אה Observant) was the name of several biblical characters, including:

 A descendant of Shelah, son of Judah (son of Jacob) in 1 Chronicles 4:21.
 The son of Joshua and father of Elmadam.

EranEran was a son of Shuthelah of the Tribe of Ephraim according to Numbers 26:36.

Eri
In  Eri (עֵרי "watchful") is the son of Gad. He was the progenitor of the Erites.

 Eshek Eshek is a name which appears only once in the Hebrew Bible, in a genealogy of the Tribe of Benjamin. The text of Chronicles identifies him as the brother of Azel.

 Ethnan Ethnan, the son of Ashur the father of Tekoa, is a figure who appears in a genealogy of the Tribe of Judah in 1 Chronicles 4:7. He may be included in the genealogy to represent Ithnan, a Judahite city mentioned in Joshua 15:23.

 Ethni 
See Ethni.

EviEvi was one of five Midianite kings killed during the time of Moses by an Israelite expedition led by Phinehas, son of Eleazar according to Numbers 31:8 and Joshua 13:21.

 Ezbon Ezbon is the name of two people mentioned in the Bible:
 A son of Gad. In  his name is given as Ozni, whose descendants constitute the Oznite clan.
 A son of Benjamin.

EzrahEzrah is the father of Jether, Mered, Epher and Jalon, grandfather (through Mered) of Miriam, Shammai and Ishbah, and great-grandfather (through Ishbah) of Eshtemoa

G

GaddiGaddi, the son of Susi of the House of Manasseh, was a scout sent to Canaan prior to the crossing of the Jordan River according to Numbers 13:11.

GaddielGaddiel, the son of Sodi of the house of Zebulun, was a scout sent to Canaan prior to the crossing of the Jordan River according to Numbers 13:10.

GahamGaham, was a son of Nahor through his concubine, Reumah.

GamalielGamaliel, son of Pedahzur was leader of the tribe of Manasseh, one of the leaders of the tribes of Israel, mentioned several times in the Book of Numbers.

 Gamul Gamul ("rewarded" or "recompense") was head of the twentieth of twenty-four priestly divisions instituted by King David.

 Gatam Gatam is a name which appears in Genesis and Chronicles in a genealogy of the Edomites. In Genesis 36:11 and 1 Chronicles 1:36, Gatam is described the "son" of Eliphaz, the son of Esau (who is according to the Bible the forefather of the Edomites). In the passages which describe Gatam as a "son" of Eliphaz, he is listed alongside his "brothers": Teman, Omar, Zepho, and Kenaz according to Genesis; a similar but slightly larger list of brothers in Chronicles (Chronicles includes Amalek as a brother of Gatam). However, in Genesis 36:16, Gatam and Amalek (along with a previously unmentioned Korah) are described not as individual sons but as "clans" of Eliphaz.

 Gazez 
In the Masoretic Text of the Hebrew Bible, two individuals by the name of Gazez appear in 1 Chronicles 2:46. However, the Peshitta includes only one Gazez, and at least one biblical scholar has suggested that the second Gazez may have been included in the Masoretic Text by mistake.

1. Gazez was the son of Haran, grandson of Caleb, a descendant of Jacob. His paternal grandmother was Ephah, wife of Caleb.

2. Gazez was a brother of Caleb, and uncle of 1. Gazez.

GeberGeber (Hebrew: גבר, geber), son of Uri, was one of King Solomon's regional administrators; his territory was Gilead. (First Kings 4:19)

GemalliGemalli of the house of Dan was the father of Ammiel, a scout sent to Canaan prior to the crossing of the Jordan River according to Numbers 13:4.

GemariahGemariah (Hebrew: גמריה) is the name of at least two biblical characters:
 Gemariah son of Shaphan in chapter 36 of Jeremiah.  His own son Micaiah hears Jeremiah's secretary Baruch read Jeremiah's prophecies against the nation, and reports to a meeting of the court officials, including his father, nearby.  This leads to the scroll being read before king Jehoiakim, who cuts it up and burns it despite the protestations of Gemariah and Elnathan ben Achbor.
 Gemariah son of Hilkiah, one of the envoys whom King Zedekiah sent to Babylonia (Jeremiah 29:3) Nothing else is known of him; he was hardly the brother of Jeremiah, whose father was also named Hilkiah.

GenubathGenubath (Hebrew: גנבת genubat "Stolen" ) is mentioned in I Kings 11:20 as the son born to Hadad the Edomite and the sister of Queen Tahpenes, Pharaoh's wife.

Gera
Hebrew: גרא Ger'a
 In  Gera is the fourth of ten sons of Benjamin.
 Gera is also the name of the father of Shimei (2 Samuel 19:16)
 Gera is also the name of two of the sons of Bela (see above), making both nephews of the earlier Gera.
 Gera is also the name of the father of Ehud, a "Benjamite, a man left-handed" – Book of Judges, 3:15.

GeuelGeuel, the son of Machi of the Tribe of Gad, was a scout sent to Canaan prior to the crossing of the Jordan River according to Numbers 13:16.

GinathGinath is a name which is mentioned only in passing in a narrative describing the struggle for kingship between Omri and Tibni. Tibni is referred to in 1 Kings 16:21 and 22 as "son of Ginath," which taken literally, could be read as implying that a person named Ginath was Tibni's father. However, the Encyclopaedia Biblica suggests that the term "Ginath" is a place-name or clan-name, so that "Tibni son of Ginath" has the meaning "Tibni of Ginath."

GideoniGideoni (Hebrew: גִּדְעֹנִי) was a member of the tribe of Benjamin according to Numbers 1:11. He was the father of Abidan, a tribal chief. He is mentioned five times in the Book of Numbers, with each reference stating his relation to Abidan (.) His name is variously understood as meaning "one with a disabled hand," "a youth," or "one who cuts down trees."

GiddaltiGiddalti was one of the sons of Heman the Levite, and chief of the twenty-two division of the temple musicians 1 Chronicles 25:29. He was also a Kohathite Levi.

 Gilalai Gilalai is the name of a priest who participated as a musician in a procession led by Ezra.

 Gishpa Gishpa, (KJV Gispa) was one of two leaders of the Nethinim who lived in Ophel, according to Nehemiah 11:21. There are no other mentions of the name anywhere else in the Bible.

GuniGuni was a son of Naphtali according to Genesis 46:24 and Numbers 26:48. He was one of the 70 souls to migrate to Egypt with Jacob.

H

HaahashtariHaahashtari or Ahashtari was one of the sons of Naarah, one of the two wives of Asshur (1 Chronicles 4:6). Because the name is used to refer to a family of Judahites who descend from Judah via Ashhur, Thomas Kelly Cheyne believed that the name "Haahashtari" arose from a confusion between Ha-Ashhuri ("the Ashhurite") with the obscure term ahashtranim which appears in Esther 8:10.

HabaiahHabaiah (also called Hobaiah or Obdia) was the name given to a priestly family mentioned in Ezra 2:61: the b'ne habayah (literally "sons/descendants of Habaiah"). Along with the families Hakkoz and Barzillai, the Habaiah family were priests whose names were not registered in the official genealogical records. As a result, Ezra ruled that their rights to serve as priests would be restricted until such time as a high priest could decide, using the oracular Urim and Thummim, whether they had divine approval to serve as priests.

The name "Habaiah" means "Yahweh hides" or "Yahweh protects," and appears in manuscripts of the Greek Septuagint in the forms Labeia, Obaia, Odogia, Ebeia, Ab(e)ia, Obbeia, and Obdia. 

HabazziniahHabazziniah or Habaziniah was either the head of a family of Rechabites (Jeremiah 35:3), or else a place name for the location that a Rechabite lived. According to Cheyne and Black, it may have been a scribal error where the name "Kabzeel," a place in the territory of Judah, was originally intended."

HachmoniHachmoni or Hakmoni is mentioned in passing in 1 Chronicles 27:32, which records that his son Yechiel, a scribe, tutored David's sons.

Hadadezer
According to I Kings 11:23, Hadadezer (Hebrew: הדדעזר hadad'ezer "Hadad helps") was king of Zobah.

HaddadHaddad the Edomite was an adversary of Solomon (I Kings 10:14).

HadlaiHadlai is mentioned in 2 Chronicles 28:12 as an Ephraimite, and the father of Amasa. In manuscripts of the Greek Septuagint, his name is given as Choab, Addi, or Adli.

HagabHagab (also Agaba, Accaba) is identified as the ancestor of a family of Nethinim, or temple assistants, who returned from the Babylonian exile. They appear in a list with other returnees in Ezra 2:46, but are omitted in the corresponding place in Nehemiah 7:48. A Hellenized version of this name appears in a similar context in 1 Esdras 5:30. In the New Testament, a prophet who appears in Acts 11:28 and 21:10 is named Agabus, a variant on the name Hagab.

Hagab is a different character from Hagabah, which appears in the preceding verse.

HagabahHagabah (also Hagaba, Graba, or Aggaba) is identified as the ancestor of a family of Nethinim, or temple assistants, who returned from the Babylonian captivity. They appear in a list with other returnees in Ezra 2:45, Nehemiah 7:48, and 1 Esdras 5:29.

HaggiahHaggiah, of the tribe of Levi through Merari, is described in  being the son of Shimea and the father of Asaiah, one of the last contemporaries of David.

HaggiHaggi was a son of Gad according to  Genesis 46:16 and Numbers 26:15. He was one of the 70 persons to migrate to Egypt with Jacob.

 Hajehudijah 
See Jehudijah.

HakkatanHakkatan (also Acatan, Akatan), meaning "the small one," is listed as the father of Johanan, a leader of the descendants of Azgad in Ezra 8:12 and 1 Esdras 8:38. Other than these two verses, the name Hakkatan appears nowhere in the Bible.

 Hakkoz Hakkoz is the name of two or three biblical individuals:
 Head of the seventh of twenty-four priestly divisions created by King David.
 Head of a family of priests after the Babylonian exile. Unable to prove their lineage, the family lost its priesthood status.
 Father of Uriah and grandfather of Meremoth, who assisted Nehemiah in rebuilding the walls of Jerusalem. He is probably identical to the previous entry.

HalloheshHallohesh or Halohesh is a name which is used twice in the Bible. In a list of workers building the wall of Nehemiah, a man named "Shallum son of Hallohesh" is mentioned as having a leadership role. Also in the Book of Nehemiah, a person named Hallohesh is recorded as affixing his seal (an ancient form of signature) to Ezra's covenant between God and the people living around Jerusalem.

Thomas Kelly Cheyne believed that the name Hallohesh was a miswritten version of the name Hash-shilhi, (Shilhi).

HammedathaHammedatha was an Agagite and the father of Haman (see ).

HammolekethHammoleketh or Hammolecheth is the sister of Machir, the eponymous ancestor of the tribe or clan of Machir (biblical region) Machir, which is reckoned as a part of the tribe of Manasseh in 1 Chronicles 7. The name appears to mean "she who reigns" if it is not a scribal error for some other name, such as Beth-Milcah.

HammelechHammelech, in the King James Version is the name of the father of Jerahmeel (Jeremiah 36:26), and it is the name of the father of Malkijah (Jeremiah 38:6). In a number of more recent translations, the Hebrew ha-melekh is taken as the common noun "the king" instead of the proper noun "Hammelech."

HamorHamor was the father of Shechem. Shechem defiled Dinah, according to Genesis 34

HamulHamul was a son of Pharez of the Tribe of Judah according to  Genesis 46:12 and Numbers 26:21. He was one of the 70 souls to migrate to Egypt with Jacob.

HamutalHamutal was the daughter of Jeremiah of Libnah and, the wife of King Josiah who bore him Jehoahaz and Zedekiah.

HanameelHanameel or Hanamel (Hebrew: חנמאל, which means "Grace From God"), a cousin of Jeremiah from whom the latter bought a field at Anathoth in Jeremiah 32:5–16.

HananiahHananiah (Hebrew: חנניה, which means "My Grace is the Lord") is the name of several biblical characters:
 Hananiah son of Zerubbabel, the father of Jeshaiah, was a descendant of David.
 Hananiah son of Azur, a prophet in the time of king Zedekiah. He prophesied a return from the exile in Babylon within two years and was denounced by Jeremiah as a false prophet as a result. He died within a year of the denunciation.
 Hananiah, appointed by Nehemiah, jointly with Hanani, to be responsible for the security of Jerusalem after its walls had been rebuilt. Nehemiah described him as "a faithful man [who] feared God more than many".

HannielHanniel Prince of the tribe of Manasseh; one of those appointed by Moses to superintend the division of Canaan amongst the tribe (Num. 34:23).

HanochHanoch is the name of two biblical figures:
 A son of Midian, the eponymous forefather of the Midianites.
 A son of Reuben, the eponymous forefather of the Tribe of Reuben.

According to Cheyne and Black, the presence of this clan name in the genealogies of Reuben and Midian may indicate that the clan Hanoch was considered a part of the Tribe of Reuben but had a Midianite origin.

HappizzezHappizzez or Aphses was a priest who fell on the eighteenth lot out of the twenty-four lots ordained by David for the temple service.

 Haran Haran or Aran refers to three minor characters in the Hebrew Bible:

 Haran ( – Hārān), son of Terah, from Ur of the Chaldees. He fathered Lot, Milcah and Iscah.
 Haran ( – Ḥārān), son of Caleb, a descendant of Jacob, and Ephah his mother. Father of 1.Gazez, and brother of 2.Gazez.

 Harbona Harbona or Harbonah is the name given for one of the eunuchs of king Ahasuerus in Esther 1:10 and 7:9.

 Hareph Hareph, according to 1 Chronicles 2:51, was a descendant of Caleb and the father of Beth-gader. The name "Hareph" in this case may refer to a group of people otherwise referred to by the term Hariphite.

 Harhaiah Harhaiah, in the Masoretic Text of Nehemiah 3:8, is mentioned in passing, as being the father of Uzziel, a man responsible for the repair of part of the wall of Jerusalem. The awkward phrasing of the verse suggested to Stanley A. Cook (1899) that there had been some scribal mishandling of the verse, and that the verse originally did not contain the name "Harhaiah."

 Harhas Harhas, according to 2 Kings 22:14 and 2 Chronicles 34:22, was an ancestor of Shallum, the husband of the prophetess Huldah. However, where the Book of Kings has "Harhas," the Book of Chronicles reads "Hasrah."

 Harim Harim ("destroyed" or "dedicated to God") was the name of three biblical patriarchs:
 Head of the third of twenty-four priestly divisions instituted by King David.
 Head of a non-priestly family, with 320 members, which returned with Zerubbabel. Eight members of this family were found to have married gentile women, whom they divorced. Harim's son Malchijah was one of those who helped repair the walls of Jerusalem, including the Tower of the Furnaces. His seal was on the renewed covenant with God made by the Babylonian returnees.
 Head of a priestly family, with 1017 members, which returned with Zerubbabel. Five members of this family were found to have married gentile women, whom they divorced. His seal was also on the renewed covenant. The head of his family at the time of the return was Adna.

 Harnepher Harnepher appears only once in the Bible, in 1 Chronicles 7:36, in a passage which surveys the descendants of Asher. The name may be of Egyptian origin, meaning "Horus is good."

 Harum Harum is recorded as the father of Aharhel in 1 Chronicles 4:8, which lists him as an ancestor of several clans in the Tribe of Judah.

 Harumaph Harumaph is listed as the father of Jedaiah, a man responsible for making repairs to a part of Nehemiah's wall. He is only mentioned once in the Bible, in Nehemiah 3:10.

HaruzHaruz (Hebrew: חרוז) was the father of Queen Meshullemeth. According to  he was a citizen who dwelt in the land of Jotbah.

 Hasadiah Hasadiah is listed as one of the sons of Zerubabel in 1 Chronicles 3:20, and is therefore a member of the royal lineage of the Judahite kings.

 Hashabiah Hashabiah is a biblical name which appears frequently for individuals mentioned both before and after the Babylonian captivity.

Because the name often appears in lists without any detailed description, it is sometimes difficult to tell whether different verses that use the name are referring to the same Hashabiah or to distinct persons. The following list of nine individuals is the number listed in the Encyclopaedia Biblica, although the encyclopedia does not claim that precisely nine people of this name are mentioned:
 A Levite of the Merarite group, mentioned 1 Chronicles 6:45 (verse 30 in some Bibles).
 Hashabiah son of Bunni, a Merarite Levite listed as living in Jerusalem in 1 Chronicles 9:14 and Nehemiah 11:15.
 A leader of a large group of people in the time of David.
 A musician, one of the musicians appointed by David for the musical service of the Temple.
 Hashabiah son of Kemuel, identified as the leader of the Levites in the time of David.
 A Levite leader in the time of Josiah.
 A Levite identified as having signed the covenant between Ezra and God.
 A ruler listed as one of the people responsible for repairing the wall of Jerusalem in Nehemiah 3:17.
 The ruler of the clan of Hilkiah, according to Nehemiah 12:21.

 Hashabnah Hashabnah is the name given for one of the men who signed the covenant between the people of Judah and God in Nehemiah 10:25 (verse 26 in some Bibles). According to Cheyne and Black, the name is likely a miswritten form of "Hashabniah."

 Hashub Hashub is mentioned in passing as the father of Shemaiah, a Levite who is listed among those living in Jerusalem after the end of the Babylonian captivity.

 Hashubah Hashubah is listed as one of the children of Zerubabel, the governor of Yehud Medinata.

 Hasrah Hasrah, according to 2 Chronicles 34:22, is the name of an ancestor of Shallum, the husband of the prophetess Huldah. However, where the Book of Chronicles has "Hasrah", 2 Kings 22:14 has "Harhas".

Hassenaah
The sons of Hassenaah built the Fish Gate during the reconstruction of the walls of Jerusalem under the repair programme led by Nehemiah.

 Hasupha Hasupha (Hashupha in the King James Version) is the name of a clan or family of Nethinim (temple assistants) listed in Nehemiah 7:46 and Ezra 2:43.

 Hathach Hathach or Hatach is the name of one of the eunuchs of Ahasuerus in the Book of Esther. He acts as a messenger between Esther and Mordecai.

 Hathath 
Hathath is only mentioned in 1 Chronicles 4:13, in a genealogical passage where he is the son of Othniel, the son of Kenaz.

 Hattil 
The descendants of Hattil (also called Agia or Hagia) are listed in Ezra 2:57 and Nehemiah 7:59 as a group of people returning from the Babylonian captivity (see Ezra–Nehemiah). They are categorized by Ezra as being descendants of "Solomon's servants" (see Nethinim). In the Greek text of 1 Esdras 5:34, a closely related work, Hattil is referred to as Agia or Hagia.

 Hazaiah Hazaiah is a figure mentioned in passing in Nehemiah 11:5 as an ancestor Maaseiah, a notable leader of the Tribe of Judah in Yehud Medinata.

HazoHazo was the son of Nahor and Milcah.

Heber probably should not be confused with the Eber who was Abraham's ancestor.

HelHel was a son of Gilead of the Tribe of Manasseh according to Numbers 26:30 and Joshua 17:2.

Ashur's sons through Helah his wife were: Zereth, Jezoar and Ethnan.

 Heldai Heldai is the name of two biblical figures. According to the Encyclopaedia Biblica, it should most likely be given alternate vowels as Holdai or Huldai.
 Heldai son of Baanah the Netophathite is listed as one of David's Mighty Warriors, and also in a list of military leaders given in 1 Chronicles 27:15. He is called "Heled" in 1 Chronicles 11:30, and "Heleb" in 2 Samuel 23:29.
 A Jew living in Babylonia, mentioned in Zechariah 6:10. He is called Helem in Zechariah 6:14.

Helez
There are two biblical figures named Helez:
A Jerahmeelite; the father of Eleasah and the son of Azariah mentioned in ( 1 Chronicles 2:39).
A captain in the seventh week mentioned in ( 1 Chronicles 27:10).

 Helkai Helkai is a name used in Nehemiah 12:15, in a list of priestly clan leaders in the "days of Joiakim." The text refers to Helkai as leading a clan named Meraioth. According to the Encyclopaedia Biblica, the name is an abbreviated form of "Hilkiah."

HelonHelon was a member of the house of Zebulun according to Numbers 1:9. He was the father of Eliab.

 Hemam Hemam or Homam is the name of the son of Lotan and grandson of Seir the Horite, according to Genesis 36:22 and 1 Chronicles 1:39.

 Henadad Henadad is a biblical name which appears only in Ezra–Nehemiah. In a passage which describes the rebuilding of the wall of Jerusalem, two "sons of Henadad", Bavai and Binnui, are named as taking responsibility for portions of the wall. Binnui reappears later, where he is described as a Levite and as one of the signatories of the covenant between Ezra, God, and the people of Judah. The "sons of Henadad," though without any specific individuals named, are mentioned in also in Ezra 3:9, a "difficult passage".

HepherHepher was a son of Manasseh according to Numbers 26:32 and Joshua 17:2. See List of minor biblical places § Hepher.

HezekiahHezekiah is the name of three minor figures in the Hebrew Bible. In some Bibles the variant spellings Hizkiah and Hizkijah occur.
 A son of Neariah and descendant of David mentioned in the royal genealogy of 1 Chronicles 3.
 A figure mentioned in passing in Ezra 2:16 and Nehemiah 7:21, as the ancestor of some of the exiles who returned from the Babylonian captivity.
 An ancestor of the prophet Zephaniah.

HezirHezir is the name of 2 biblical individuals in the Hebrew Bible.
A priest in the head of the seventeenth lot of the twenty-four lots ordained by David.
An individual who signed the covenant with Nehemiah.

HezronHezron or Hetzron is the name of two men in Genesis.
 In , Hezron is a son of Reuben and the founder of the Hezronites.
 In , Hezron is grandson of Judah and the son of Pharez.

HielHiel the Bethelite (Heb. אֲחִיאֵל, חִיאֵל; "the [divine] brother, or kinsman, is God")) rebuilt Jericho during the reign of King Ahab. (I Kings 16:34)

Hillel of Pirathon
 The father of Abdon, in the Book of Judges (Judges 12:13–15).

 Hiram Hiram (Hebrew: חירם Ḥiram) of Tyre, son of a widow of the tribe of Naphtali whose father was a craftsman in bronze, was given the metal work of King Soloman's temple.  I Kings 7:13–14.  According to The Interpreter's Bible, Hiram is a shortened form of אחירם (aḥîrām, "brother of Ram [the lofty one].")

 Hobab Hobab was Moses' father-in-law and the son of Moses's father-in-law, Jethro. The relevant part of Numbers 10:29 reads: "And Moses said unto Hobab, the son of Reuel the Midianite, Moses' father-in-law". Reuel (or Raguel) and Jethro may have been different persons from different narratives. That of Judges 4:11 reads: "Now Heber the Kenite had severed himself from the Kenites, even from the children of Hobab the father-in-law of Moses". Moses invited Hobab to take part in the Exodus journey into the Promised Land, wanting to make use of his local knowledge, but Hobab preferred to return home to Midian. Briefly, Hobab, Reuel/Raguel, and Jethro were all Moses' father-in-law, due to different traditions (and possibly corruptions of the text) which were syncretized in the interpretations of later commentators.

 Hod Hod is a biblical name which appears only in 1 Chronicles 7:37. He appears as one character in a genealogy of the Tribe of Asher.

HodaviahHodaviah is the name of three individuals in the Bible. The Revised Version and King James Version of the Bible sometimes spell it as Hodaiah, Hodevah, or Hodeiah. Hodaviah, a clan leader in the Tribe of Manasseh, according to 1 Chronicles 5:24.
 Hodaviah son of Hassenuah appears as the ancestor of a Benjamite man living in Jerusalem after the Babylonian captivity.  This Hodaviah is called "Judah son of Hassenuah" in Nehemian 11:9.
 Hodaviah son of Elioenai is described as a descendant of Zerubbabel in 1 Chronicles 3:24

 Hodesh Hodesh is a figure who appears in a genealogy of the Tribe of Benjamin in Chronicles. The name might mean "born at the feast of the new moon," or else it may be a misspelling of Ahishahar.

 Hoham Hoham, according to the Book of Joshua, was the king of Hebron, defeated in Joshua's conquest.

 Homam 
See Hemam.

 Hon 
See On (biblical figure)

HoriHori is the personal name of two biblical individuals, as well as being the Hebrew term for a Horite.
 Hori of the house of Simeon was the father of Shaphat, a scout sent to Canaan prior to the crossing of the Jordan River according to Numbers 13:5.
 Hori is recorded as the name of Lotan, the son of Seir the Horite, according to Genesis 36:22.

 Hoshama Hoshama is the name of one of the seven sons of Jeconiah, according to 1 Chronicles 3:18, the only place in the Bible that refers to him. It is a shortened version of the name "Jehoshama."

 Hotham Hotham is the name for two individuals found in the BIble. A Hotham appears in a genealogy of the Tribe of Asher in 1 Chronicles 7:32, but this individual is referred to as "Helem" in verse 35. Another Hotham, though the KJV calls him Hothan, can be found in 1 Chronicles 11:44, where his sons Shama and Jeiel are listed among David's Mighty Warriors. This second Hotham is called an Aroerite.

 Hothir Hothir is listed as a son of David's "seer" Heman in 1 Chronicles 25:4 and 28.

 Hubbah 
See Jehubbah.

HuppahHuppah was a priest who was in charge of the 13th lot out of the twenty-four lots ordained by David.

HuppimHuppim (חופים) or Hupham  (חופם) was the ninth son of Benjamin in Genesis 46:21 and Numbers 26:39.

HushimHushim, according to Genesis 46:23, was the name of the sons of Dan, listed among the 70 souls to migrate to Egypt with Jacob. Numbers 26:42 calls Dan's son Shuham, and his descendants the Shuhamites. The Talmud names him as the murderer of Esau.

 Huzzab Huzzab is either a name or a word which appears in Nahum 2:7 (verse 8 in some Bibles). In a passage in which Nahum is predicting the fall of Nineveh, the prophet says, "Huzzab shall be led away captive" in the King James Version. However, a number of more contemporary versions since the late nineteenth century have interpreted the word as a verb, meaning "and it has been decreed."See also the New International Version and New Living Translation.

I

 Ibhar Ibhar was one of the sons of David. The name Ibhar means "Chosen".1 Chronicles 3:6

 Ibneiah Ibneiah is the name given in Chronicles to a leader of a clan in the Tribe of Benjamin which returned to Yehud Medinata after the Babylonian captivity. The same character is referred to as "Gabbai" in the parallel passage in Nehemiah.

 Ibnijah Ibnijah is a figure who is mentioned indirectly in 1 Chronicles 9:8, by way of his descendant "Meshullam, son of Shephatiah, son of Reuel, son of Ibnijah." He was a Benjamite.

 Ibsam 
According to Chronicles, Ibsam was the son of Tola, who in turn was the son of Issachar. He is called Jibsam in the King James Version.

 Idbash Idbash, according to 1 Chronicles 4:3, was one of the sons of Etham, a figure who appears in the Chronicler's genealogy of the Tribe of Judah.

IgalIgal is the name of three biblical figures.
 Igal son of Joseph of Issachar, a scout sent to Canaan prior to the crossing of the Jordan River according to Numbers 13:7.
 Igal son of Nathan of Zobah is mentioned only in 2 Samuel 23:36 in a list of David's Mighty Warriors.
 Igal son of Shemaiah is listed as a descendant of Zerubbabel in 1 Chronicles 3:22. This last figure is called Igeal in the King James Version, although his name in Hebrew is the same as the other two Igals.

 Igdaliah Igdaliah (Hebrew yigdalyahu) is mentioned in passing as the father of a man named Hanan in Jeremiah 35:3. According to the Book of Jeremiah, the sons or descendants of Hanan son of Igdaliah had their own chamber in the temple at Jerusalem, which was the site of the famous object-lesson concerning Jeremiah and the Rechabites. The Encyclopaedia Biblica claimed that the name Igdaliah was most likely a mistaken form of the name Gedaliah.

IkkeshIkkesh the Tekoite was the father of Ira, one of King David's Warriors (2 Samuel 23:26, 1 Chronicles 11:28).

 Ilai 
See Zalmon (biblical figure).

ImlaImla (Hebrew – ימלא, "whom God will fill up" ), the father of Micaiah, which latter was the prophet who foretold the defeat of the allied kings of Judah and Israel against Ramoth-gilead (2 Chron 18:7–8). In the parallel passage (1 Kings  22:8–9) his name is written Imlah.

ImmerImmer was a member of the priestly family whose sons, Hanani and Zebadiah, had both taken pagan wives but repented during the communal confession instigated by the biblical priest Ezra.

 Imna Imna is a biblical name which appears only in 1 Chronicles 7:35, in a genealogy of the Tribe of Asher.

ImnahImnah was a levite, the father of Kore, who was responsible for distributing the freewill offerings of the Temple in the time of King Hezekiah.

 Imrah Imrah is a biblical name which appears only in 1 Chronicles 7:36, in a genealogy of the Tribe of Asher.

 Imri Imri is the name of two individuals mentioned in the Hebrew Bible.
 An Imri is mentioned in passing in the ancestry of a man named Uthai, who according to 1 Chronicles 9:4 lived in Jerusalem after the return from the Babylonian captivity.
 A man named "Zakkur son of Imri" is recorded as taking responsibility for a section of the wall in the project of rebuilding the wall of Jerusalem, according to Nehemiah 3:2.

 Iphdeiah Iphdeiah (KJV Iphediah) is a name which appears very briefly as that of "Iphdeiah son of Shashak," mentioned only in a genealogy of the Tribe of Asher according to Chronicles.

 Ir 
See Iri (biblical figure).

Ira the JairiteIra the Jairite was David's chief minister after Sheba's rebellion. While described as David's priest by the English Standard Version and New International Version, he was obviously his chief ruler (by the King James Version) or his chief minister (by the New King James Version) as the Hebrew word כהן originally meant 'official' or 'person of influence'. Later the meaning shifted to 'priest' only; hence the mistake in Christian translations.

Irad
In , Irad ( – Īrāḏ), is the son of Enoch, the grandson of Cain and the father of Mehujael.

According to the Book of Moses (an LDS text), Irad discovers and publicises his great-grandson Lamech's (descendant of Cain) covenant with the Devil. As a result, Lamech kills Irad and subsequently suffers ostracization.

 Iram Iram is a name which appears in Genesis 36:43. In the Masoretic Text as it now stands, Iram is identified as a "tribal leader" (Hebrew alluph) of Edom. However, Thomas Kelly suggests that originally the text may have identified Iram and the other "tribal leaders" as the names not of individuals, but of clans, using the Hebrew word eleph to mean "clan."

 Iri Iri, according to 1 Chronicles 7:7, was one of the sons of Bela, who was the son of Benjamin, eponymous founder of the Tribe of Benjamin. In verse 12, he is referred to simply as Ir.

IrijahIrijah (Hebrew יראייה yiriyyah) is an official who arrests Jeremiah on suspicion of desertion.

 Iru Iru is a name mentioned only once in the Hebrew Bible. In 1 Chronicles 4:15, Iru is listed as one of the sons of Caleb. The other two were Elah and Naam.

IscahIscah or Jesca (Jessica) was a daughter of Haran, sister of Lot and Milcah according to Genesis 11:29.

 Ishbah 
For the "Ishbah, father of Eshtemoa" mentioned in 1 Chronicles, see List of minor biblical tribes § Ishbah.

 Ishbi-benob Ishbi-benob is a name which appears in the Qere of the Masoretic Text at 2 Samuel 21:16. Qere is the term for the version of the text traditionally read aloud in synagogues. The Ketiv, the version written but not read aloud, reads somewhat differently, in a manner that suggested to Thomas Kelly Cheyne that the opening words of the verse were not the name of the giant, but words that indicated that David and his soldiers stayed in (the city of) Nob. Whatever the case with the Ketiv, the Qere as it now stands asserts that Ishbi-benob was the name of a Philistine giant, who was killed by Abishai son of Zeruiah.2 Samuel 21:16–17 Gesenius interprets his name as meaning "dweller upon the height". In Brenton's Septuagint Translation, his name is given as Jesbi, the progeny of Rapha.

 Ishhod Ishhod (King James Version Ishod) is a figure mentioned only once in the Hebrew Bible. 1 Chronicles 7:18 lists Ishod as a son of Hammoleketh in a genealogy of the Tribe of Manasseh.

 Ishi Ishi is mentioned in Chronicles several times.

 Ishiah 

 Ishijah 

 Ishmael Ishmael was the name of 6 biblical individuals in the Hebrew Bible:
Ishmael the firstborn of Abraham through Hagar and mentioned many times in the Hebrew Bible.
Ishmael the son of Nethaniah who assassinated Gedaliah at the time of Nebuchadnezzar II.
One of the sons of Pashur which was Elioenai, Maaseiah, Ishmael, Nethaneel, Jozabad and Eleasah.

 Ishmaiah Ishmaiah (KJV Ismaiah) is the name of two biblical figures.
 Ishmaiah son of Obadiah was the leader of the Tribe of Zebulun in the time of David, according to 1 Chronicles 27:19. He is called Samaias in the Septuagint.
 Ishmaiah the Gibeonite, according to 1 Chronicles 12:4, was one of David's Mighty Warriors.

 Ishmerai Ishmerai is a biblical figure mentioned only in 1 Chronicles 8:18, where he is called "the son of Elpaal" in a genealogy of the Tribe of Benjamin. He may be the same character as the "Shemer" or "Shemed" mentioned in 1 Chronicles 8:12.

 Ishod 
See Ishhod.

 Ishpah Ishpah (KJV Ispah) is a name which appears in a genealogy of the Tribe of Benjamin. According to 1 Chronicles 8, Ishpah was the son of Beriah, the son of Elpaal, the son of Shaharaim.

 Ishpan Ishpan is a figure who appears only once in the Hebrew Bible, in a genealogical passage describing the people of the Tribe of Benjamin. 1 Chronicles 8 calls him the son of Shashak, the son of Elpaal, the son of Shaharaim.

 Ishuah 
See Ishvah.

 Ishuai 
See Ishvah.

Ishui
See Ishvi.

 Ishvah Ishvah (KJV Ishuah and Isuah) was one of the sons of Asher according to Genesis 46:17 and 1 Chronicles 7:30, although he is missing from the list of the sons of Asher found in Numbers 26:44.

 Ishvi Ishvi (KJV Ishui, Isui, Jesui, and Ishuai) is the name of two figures in the Hebrew Bible.
 Ishvi is the name given to a son of Asher, eponymous founder of the Tribe of Asher, in Genesis 46:17, Numbers 26:44, and 1 Chronicles 7:30. His descendants are called Ishvites in Numbers 24:44. Genesis 46 places him in the list of 70 persons who went down into Egypt with Jacob, the father of Asher and the other eleven Tribes of Israel.
 Ishvi is the name of a son of Saul in 1 Samuel 14:49.

 Ismaiah 
See Ishmaiah.

 Ispah 
See Ishpah.

 Isshiah 

 Isshijah 

Isui
See Ishvi.

 Ithai 
See Ittai.

 Ithmah Ithmah is a name which appears only once in the Hebrew Bible, in 1 Chronicles 11:46, where "Ithmah the Moabite" is listed as one of David's Mighty Warriors.

 Ithran Ithran is the name given for two figures in the Hebrew Bible.
 Ithran, son of Dishon, son of Anah, son of Zibeon, son of Seir the Horite. This Ithran represents the name of a Horite clan.
 Ithran, son of Zophah, son of Helem appears in a genealogy of the Tribe of Asher. The Encyclopaedia Biblica identifies the "Jether" of 1 Chronicles 7:38 as probably being identical to this Ithran.

IthreamIthream (יתרעם, "abundant people") was the son of David and Eglah, David's sixth son, according to II Samuel 3:5.

 Ittai Ittai (and once in Chronicles, Ithai) is the name given one or two biblical figures:
 Ittai the Gittite appears alongside 600 soldiers as a Philistine ally of David in the time leading up to Absalom's rebellion. Having only recently arrived in Jerusalem, David gives him an option to return home to Gath, but Ittai confirms his loyalty to David and helps him evacuate the city. During the rebellion itself, he serves as commander of a third of David's army.
 Ittai "son of Ribai, from Gibeah, of the children of Benjamin" is listed as one of David's Mighty Warriors. His association with Gibeah and the Tribe of Benjamin "probably" distinguish him from the Gittite Ittai, according to Stanley Arthur Cook. This Benjamite Ittai is once called Ithai in 1 Chronicles 11:31.

 Izhar 
For the Levitical clan, see Izhar.Izhar son of Hela is a figure who appears in a genealogy of the Tribe of Judah, in 1 Chronicles 4:7. He is called Izhar according to the variant reading known as Qere. According to the Ketiv his name is Zohar. The King James Version calls him Jezoar.

 Izrahiah Izrahiah (Jezrahiah) is the name of two biblical figures.
 Izrahiah son of Uzzi, son of Tola, son of Issachar appears in a genealogy of the Tribe of Issachar.
 Izrahiah (KJV Jezrahiah) is, according to Nehemiah 12:42, a leader of singers in a procession headed by Nehemiah.

 Izri Izri (Zeri) appears in a list of persons responsible for liturgical music in the time of David, according to 1 Chronicles 25:11. In 1 Chronicles 25:3, he is called Zeri.

 Izziah Izziah (KJV Jeziah), a descendant of Parosh, is listed as one of the men who married foreign wives in the time of Nehemiah.

J

 Jaanai 
See Janai (biblical figure). See Djenne'.

 Jaareshiah Jaareshiah (KJV Jaresiah) is a name which appears only , where Jaaresiah is identified as one of the sons of Jeroham. The text does not identify any information about Jeroham's parentage, but the passage is part of a genealogy of the Tribe of Benjamin.

 Jaasai 
See Jaasu.

 Jaasau 
See Jaasu.

 Jaasiel Jaasiel (Jasiel) is the name of one of David's Mighty Warriors. He is referred to in Hebrew as hammitsovayah, which has been variously translated as "the Mezobaite," "the Mesobaite," or "from Zobah.""Mesobaite" in the King James Version, "Mezobaite" in the Revised Version and New International Version, "from Zobah" in the New Living Translation. A "Jaasiel son of Abner" is listed as a Benjamite leader in 1 Chronicles 27:21, who may be the same person.

 Jaasu Jaasu (also called Jaasau, Jaasai) is a name which appears in a list of men alleged to have married foreign women in the time of Nehemiah.

 Jaaziah Jaaziah is listed as one of the sons of Merari in a passage discussing the various divisions of Levites.

 Jaaziel Jaaziel is the name of a Levite musician who appears in 1 Chronicles 15:18. He reappears as "Aziel" in 15:20.

 Jacan Jacan (or Jachan) is a name which appears once in the Hebrew Bible, in a list of Gadites in Chronicles.

JachinJachin was a son of Simeon according to Genesis 46:10, Exodus 6:15, and Numbers 26:12, one of the 70 souls to migrate to Egypt with Jacob.

JadaJada was one of the sons of Onam mentioned in 1 Chronicles 2:28 , he had two sons Jonathan and Jether, and his brother was named Shammai. He was a descendant of Hezron.

 Jahath Jahath is the name of several individuals in the Hebrew Bible.
 Jahath son of Reaiah, son of Shobal, son of Judah (son of Jacob) is mentioned in 1 Chronicles 4:2, in a genealogical passage describing the Tribe of Judah.
 Jahath is a name applied to various Levites in 1 Chronicles 6:20 (verse 5 in some Bibles), 6:43 (verse 28 in some Bibles), 23:10, 24:22; and 2 Chronicles 34:12.

 Jahaziah 
See Jahzeiah.

JahleelJahleel was a son of Zebulun according to Genesis 46:14 and Numbers 26:26. He was one of the 70 persons to migrate to Egypt with Jacob.

 Jahmai 
For the Jahmai of 1 Chronicles 7:2, see List of minor biblical tribes § Jahmai.

JahzeelJahzeel was a son of Naphtali according to Genesis 46:24 and Numbers 26:48. He was one of the 70 persons to migrate to Egypt with Jacob.

 Jahzeiah Jahzeiah (KJV Jahaziah) son of Tikvah is one of the figures listed in the Book of Ezra as opposing Ezra's prohibition on marriages with foreign women.

 Jahzerah Jahzerah is a name which appears only in 1 Chronicles 9:12. See Ahzai.

 Jakeh Jakeh is a name that appears only in Proverbs 30:1, where part of the Book of Proverbs is ascribed to a man called "Agur son of Jakeh". Franz Delitzsch proposed that the name "Jakeh" means "scrupulously pious".

 Janai Janai (Jaanai) is a name that appears only 1 Chronicles 5:12, where Janai is listed as a descendant of Gad. According to the Encyclopaedia Biblica, the name represents the name of a clan within the Tribe of Gad.

 Jakim Jakim is the name of one individual mentioned in the Hebrew Bible, as well as one individual mentioned in some manuscripts of the New Testament's Gospel of Matthew. In a genealogy of the Tribe of Benjamin, in 1 Chronicles 24:12, a Jakim appears, as the son of Shimei (who is referred to as Shema in verse 13). In some Greek manuscripts of Matthew, a Jakim appears between Josiah and Jechoniah in a genealogy of Jesus.

 Jalon Jalon was one of four sons of Ezrah, and the uncle of Miriam, Shammai and Ishbah (father of Eshtemoa).

Jamin
The name Jamin means right hand.
There are four different Jamins in the Bible:
He was one of the 70 souls to migrate to Egypt with Jacob.
 Man of Judah, see 
 Post exile Levite who interpreted the law, see 
 The son of Ram the firstborn of Jerahmeel according to the book of 1 Chronicles.

 Jamlech Jamlech is a figure who appears once in the Hebrew Bible, in list of kin group leaders in the Tribe of Simeon, who according to the Bible lived in the time of Hezekiah and exterminated the Meunim.

Along with the other four kings, he was subsequently found in a cave at Makkedah, where he was killed and buried by Joshua and his forces.

 Jarah 
See Jehoaddah.
meaning: honey, god gives honey, honeycomb, honeysuckle

 Jareb Jareb is a name which appears in Hosea 5:13 and 10:6 in some translations of the Bible. In both passages, the Hebrew text refers to a mlk yrb (KJV "King Jareb") in a way that implies that mlk yrb is the king of Assyria. However, no Assyrian king by the name of "Jareb" is known to history, which has led to a variety of conjectures about what the phrase refers to. According to W. F. Albright, the "definitive solution" to the problem is that the text should read mlk rb or mlky rb, meaning "the great king", a Hebrew translation of the common Assyrian royal title sharru rabu. The proposed emendation to "great king" has been accepted in a number of biblical translations.

 Jarib Jarib is the name of three individuals in the Hebrew Bible, and a priest whose descendants are named in the First Book of Maccabees.
 In 1 Chronicles 4:24, one of the sons of Simeon (son of Jacob) is called Jarib. In other passages, he is called Jachin.
 A Jarib appears in a list of leaders recruited by Ezra to find Levites for the resettlement of Jerusalem.
 A priest by the name of Jarib is mentioned in a list of men who married foreign women in Ezra 10:18.
 In 1 Maccabees 2:1 and 14:29, Mattathias and his son Simon are described as being "of the posterity of Jarib". The New English Translation of the Septuagint transliterates the name as Ioarib, while the New American Bible reads Joarib and the Good News Translation reads Jehoiarib.

 Jaresiah 
See Jaareshiah.

JarhaJarha was an Egyptian slave of Sheshan who was married to Sheshan's daughter according to 1 Chronicles 2:34–35.

 Jasiel 
See Jaasiel.

 Jasub/Jashub 
1. See Job, son of Issachar

2. See Shearjashub

3. A son of Bani in Ezra 10:29.

 Jathniel Jathniel is a minor biblical figure who appears only in 1 Chronicles 26:2, in a list of Korahite porters.

 Jaziz Jaziz the Hagrite, according to 1 Chronicles 27:31, was in charge of king David's flocks of sheep and goats.

 Jeatherai 
See Ethni.

 Jecamiah 
See Jekamiah.

JecholiahJecholiah (Hebrew: יכליהו, yekhalyahu) of Jerusalem was the wife of the King of Judah, Amaziah, and the mother of King Azariah. Depending on translation used, her name may also be spelled Jechiliah, Jecoliah, or Jekoliah.  Also 2 Chronicles 26:3

 Jediael 
There are three individuals in the Hebrew Bible named Jediael.
 Jediael son of Shimri  is listed as one of David's warriors in 1 Chronicles 11:45.
 Jediael, a man from the Tribe of Manasseh, appears in a list of warriors said to have deserted David when he went to Ziklag.
 Jediael son of Meshelemiah appears in a list of Korahite porters in the time of David.

JeezerJeezer was a son of Gilead of the Tribe of Manasseh according to Numbers 26:30.

 Jehallelel Jehallelel (KJV Jehaleleel or Jehalelel) is the name of two individuals in the Hebrew Bible.
 A Jehallelel appears in 1 Chronicles 4:16, in a genealogy of the Tribe of Judah.
 Another Jehallelel appears in a list of Levites in 2 Chronicles 29:12.

 Jehdeiah Jehdeiah is the name of two individuals in the Hebrew Bible.
 A Levite mentioned in 1 Chronicles 24:20.
 Jehdeiah the Meronothite, who according to 1 Chronicles 27:30 was in charge of king David's donkeys.

JehezkelJehezkel was the head of the twentieth lot out of the twenty-four lots ordained by David for the temple service in 1 Chronicles 24:16.

 Jehiah Jehiah is a figure who is only mentioned once in the Bible, in 1 Chronicles 15:24, which describes him as a gatekeeper for the Ark of the Covenant in the time of David.

 Jehiel 
This entry contains close paraphrases and borrowing of wording found in entries entitled "Jehiel" in the Encyclopaedia Biblica, a work which is now in the public domain.Jehiel is the name of fourteen figures in the Hebrew Bible.

For eleven of these the English spelling "Jehiel" reflects the Hebrew name יחיאל:
 A Levite musician in the time of David (1 Chronicles 15:18, 20; 16:5).
 The leader of a family of Gershonite Levites in the time of David, custodian of "the treasury of the house of the Lord" (1 Chronicles 23:8; 29:8).
 Jehiel the son of Hachmoni, who was with David's sons (1 Chronicles 27:32).
 Jehiel the son of king Jehoshaphat (2 Chronicles 21:2).
 A Hemanite Levite in the time of Hezekiah, called Jehuel in the Revised Version (2 Chronicles 29:14).
 A Levitical or priestly oversees of the temple in the time of Hezekiah (2 Chronicles 31:13).
 A person referred to as "ruler of the house of God" in the time of Josiah (2 Chronicles 35:8).
 The father of Obadiah in a post-exilic list of kin groups (Ezra 8:9).
 The father of Shechaniah (Ezra 10:2).
 Jehiel the son of Harim, a priest (Ezra 10:21).
 Jehiel the son of Elam, a layman (Ezra 10:26).

For the other three, the name Jehiel (or Jeiel) reflects the Hebrew spelling יעיאל:
 One of the sons of Elam (Ezra 10:2).
 A Gibeonite described as the "father of Gibeon" in 1 Chronicles 9:35.
 A son of Hothan the Aroerite, who along with his brother Shama was listed as one of David's Mighty Warriors in 1 Chronicles 11:44.

 Jehizkiah Jehizkiah son of Shallum is mentioned in a list of Ephraimite leaders who, according to 2 Chronicles 28, intervened along with the prophet Oded to prevent the enslavement of 200,000 people from the Kingdom of Judah during the time of the king Ahaz.

 Jehoaddah Joehoaddah (or Jehoadah, Jarah) was one of the descendants of King Saul, according to 1 Chronicles 8:33–36. In 1 Chronicles 9:42, which contains a copy of the same genealogy of Saul, his name is given as "Jarah."

JehoaddanJehoaddan (Hebrew: יהועדן, Yehōaddān; "YHWH delights") was a native of Jerusalem, the wife of King Joash of Judah, and mother of his successor, King Amaziah. II Kings 14:2

JehoiadaJehoiada (Hebrew: יהוידע,Yehoyada "The LORD Knows") was the name of at least three people in the Hebrew Bible:
 Jehoiada, a priest during the reigns of Ahaziah, Athaliah, and Joash (q.v.)
 Jehoiada, father of Benaiah (cf. Benaiah)
 Jehoiada, a priest in the time of Jeremiah (Jeremiah 29:26)

JehoshaphatJehoshaphat (Hebrew: יהושפט, yehoshaphat, God Judges), son of Paruah, was one of King Solomon's twelve regional administrators: his jurisdiction was Issachar (I Kings 4:17).Jehosphaphat, son of Ahilud, was King Solomon's recorder (I Kings 4:3).

JehozabadJehozabad (Hebrew: יהוזבד, yehozabad) is the name of three figures in the Hebrew Bible.
 Jehozabad son of Shomer was one of the assassinators of King Joash of Judah.  II Kings 12:21.  "This person is called Zabad, in 2 Chron. xxiv.26..."  
 Jehozabad, according 2 Chronicles 17:18, was a leader of 180,000 Benjamite warriors in the time of king Jehoshaphat.
 Jehozabad is listed as one of the sons of Obed-edom according to 1 Chronicles 26:4.

 Jehubbah Jehubbah (or Hubbah) is the name of an individual who appears in a genealogy of the Tribe of Asher. His name depends on which variant reading (see Qere and Ketiv) of the Masoretic Text one follows: the Ketiv reads yhbh ("Jehubbah") the Qere reads whbh ("and Hubbah").

JehudiJehudi (Hebrew יהודי "Judahite") "the son of Nethaniah, the son of Shelemiah, the son of Cushi" (Jeremiah 36:14) was one of the delegates the princes sent to fetch Baruch, Jeremiah's scribe, to read his scroll.

 Jehudijah Jehudijah, mentioned in 1 Chronicles 4:18, is the name given to the wife of Mered, and is listed as the mother of his children. Some Rabbinic sources claim that Jehudijah, a feminine form of the Hebrew yehudi, meaning "Jew," is to be used as a noun rather than a given name, interpreting the passage as "his wife, the Jewess" rather than "his wife, Jehudijah," and that it is referring to Pharaoh's daughter, Bithiah, who is mentioned in the same passage and is said to have converted to Judaism. As Bithiah was an Egyptian, it would have been worth noting that she was a Jewess, especially given the importance of matrilineality in Judaism, though this was not the case in the Biblical era.

 Jehush 
See Jeush.

JeielJeiel is the name of ten individuals in the Hebrew Bible.
 Jeiel, according to 1 Chronicles 5:7, was a leader in the Tribe of Reuben.
 Jeiel, referred to as the "father of Gibeon", was an ancestor of King Saul. The King James Version calls him "Jehiel." This figure's name is affected by variant readings preserved through the Qere and Ketiv system in the Masoretic Text: the Ketiv calls him "Jeuel," while the Qere calls him "Jeiel."
 Jeiel son of Hotham the Aroerite is listed as one of David's warriors in 1 Chronicles 11:44. The King James Version calls him "Jehiel." This figure's name is affected by variant readings preserved through the Qere and Ketiv system in the Masoretic Text: the Ketiv calls him "Jeuel," while the Qere calls him "Jeiel."
 A Jeiel is mentioned in passing in a list of gatekeepers for the Ark of the Covenant in 1 Chronicles 15:18.
 A Jeiel is listed as one of the ancestors of a Levite named Jahaziel in 2 Chronicles 20:14.
 A Jeiel was one of the scribes of Uzziah according to 2 Chronicles 26:11. This figure's name is affected by variant readings preserved through the Qere and Ketiv system in the Masoretic Text: the Ketiv calls him "Jeuel," while the Qere calls him "Jeiel."
 A Jeiel is recorded as a Levite in the time of Hezekiah. This figure's name is affected by variant readings preserved through the Qere and Ketiv system in the Masoretic Text: the Ketiv calls him "Jeuel," while the Qere calls him "Jeiel." The Revised Version calls him Jeuel, following the Ketiv.
 A Jeiel is recorded as a leader in the Tribe of Levi in time of Uzziah according to 2 Chronicles 35:9.
 In a list of returnees to Yehud Medinata after the end of the Babylonian captivity, a Jeiel is recorded as being the head of a group of relatives according to Ezra 8:13. The Revised Version calls him Jeuel.
 A Jeiel, of the "descendants of Nebo," is listed as one of the people opposing marriage to foreign women in the time of Nehemiah.

 Jekameam Jekameam son of Hebron is mentioned in passing in two genealogical passages.

 Jekamiah Jekamiah (KJV spelling Jecamiah) is the name of two individuals in the Hebrew Bible.
 Jekamiah son of Shallum, son of Sismai, son of Eleasah, son of Helez, son of Azariah, son of Jehu, son of Obed, son of Ephlal, son of Zabad, son of Nathan, son of Attai, son of Jarha, the son-in-law and slave of Sheshan, son of Ishi, son of Appaim, son of Nadab, son of Shammai, son of Onam, son of Jerahmeel, the alleged ancestor of the Jerahmeelites.
 Jekamiah, a son of Jeconiah, the last king of Judah, who was taken captive by the Babylonians.

 Jekoliah 
See Jecholiah.

 Jekuthiel Jekuthiel, father of Zanoah, appears in 1 Chronicles 4:18, in a genealogical passage concerning the Tribe of Judah.

JemimaJemimah, meaning "Dove" was a daughter of Job according to Job 42:14.

JemuelJemuel was a son of Simeon according to Genesis 46:10, Exodus 6:15, and Numbers 26:12. He was one of the 70 souls to migrate to Egypt with Jacob.

JephunnehJephunneh (יְפֻנֶּה) is a biblical name which means "for whom a way is prepared", and was the name of two biblical figures:
 A descendant of Judah, and father of Kenaz and Caleb the spy or scout, who appears to have belonged to an Edomitish tribe called Kenezites, from Kenaz their founder. See (Numbers 13:6 etc.; Num. 32:12 etc.; Josh 14:14 etc.; 1 Chr 4:15).
 A descendant of Asher, eldest of the three sons of Jether (1 Chronicles 7:38).

JerahJerah was a son of Joktan according to Genesis 10:26, 1 Chronicles 1:20.

 Jeremai Jeremai, one of the "descendants of Hashum," is a figure who appears only in Ezra 10:33, where he is listed among the men who married foreign women.

 Jeriah 
See Jerijah.

 Jerioth Jerioth ירעות "Tent Curtains" was a wife of Caleb according to 1 Chronicles 2:18.

 Jeriel Jeriel, son of Tola, son of Issachar, is found in a genealogy of the Tribe of Issachar in 1 Chronicles 7:2.

 Jerijah Jerijah (sometimes Jeriah) is listed is one of the sons of Hebron in genealogical passages in 1 Chronicles 23:19, 24:23, 26:31.

Jeroham
There are 5 people in the Hebrew Bible named Jeroham.
The Father of Elkanah, and grandfather of the prophet Samuel — in 1 Samuel 1:1. 
The father of Azareel, the "captain" of the tribe of Dan — in 1 Chronicles 27:22.
A Benjamite mentioned in 1 Chronicles 12:7 and 1 Chronicles 9:12. 
The father of Azariah, one of the "commanders of the hundreds" who formed part of Jehoiada's campaign to restore the kingship to Joash in 
A priest mentioned in 1 Chronicles 9:12; (perhaps the same as in Nehemiah 11:12).

 Jerusha Jerusha (or Jerushah) the daughter of Zadok was, according to the 2 Kings 15:33 and 2 Chronicles 27:1, the mother of king Jotham.

Jesbi
See Ishbi-benob

JeshaiahJeshaiah may refer to multiple figures in the Bible:
 A descendant of David, the father of Rephaiah, and the son of Hananiah in 1 Chronicles 3:21.
 One of eight sons of Jeduthun in 1 Chronicles 25:3.
 For the man in 1 Chronicles 24 and 26 who is sometimes called Jeshaiah, see Jesiah.

JeshebeabJeshebeab was a descendant of Aaron, who was assigned priestly duties by David.

 Jesher Jesher the son of Caleb is mentioned only in 1 Chronicles 2:18.

 Jeshishai Jeshishai is a figure mentioned only once, in passing, in a genealogy of Gad.

 Jeshohaiah Jeshohaiah appears in a list of names of Simeonites. According to Chronicles these Simeonites took pasture-land from descendants of Ham and the Meunim during the time of king Hezekiah. According to Thomas Kelly Cheyne, the name is a corruption of Maaseiah.

 Jesimiel Jesimiel appears in a list of names of Simeonites. According to Chronicles these Simeonites took pasture-land from descendants of Ham and the Meunim during the time of king Hezekiah. According to Thomas Kelly Cheyne, the name is a corruption of Maaseel.

 Jesui 
See Ishvi.

JetherJether was the name of 5 biblical individuals:
Gideon's firstborn mentioned in  out of all the 70 children he had.
A father of Amasa which was the "captain" of the host of Judah.
A Jerahmeelite mentioned in  who had no children and ends up dying.
The father of Jephunneh, Pispah and Ara.

JethethJetheth is listed as one of the "chiefs" of Edom, in Genesis 36:41.

 Jeuel Jeuel son of Zerah appears in a list of people living in Jerusalem after the end of the Babylonian exile. For four other individuals who are sometimes called "Jeuel" and sometimes "Jeiel," see Jeiel.

 Jeush Jeush is the name of four or five individuals mentioned in the Hebrew Bible.
 Jeush son of Esau. A variant manuscript reading, known as Ketiv, calls him Jeish.
 Jeush son of Bilhan, son of Jediael, the son of Benjamin, mentioned in a genealogy which describes the people of the Tribe of Benjamin.
 Jeush son of Eshek, who is mentioned in a genealogy of the Tribe of Benjamin. According to the Encyclopaedia Biblica, this is likely a reference to the same person called Jeush son of Bilhan. The King James Version calls him Jehush.
 Jeush son of Shimei represented a division of Levites according to 1 Chronicles 23:10–11.
 Jeush, the first listed son of king Rehoboam in 2 Chronicles 11:19.

JezerJezer was a son of Naphtali according to Genesis 46:24 and Numbers 26:49. He was one of the 70 persons to migrate to Egypt with Jacob. According to Numbers he was the progenitor of the Jezerites.

 Jeziah 
See Izziah.

 Jezrahiah 
See Izrahiah.

Jezreel
One of the sons of the father of Etam according to 

 Jibsam 
See Ibsam.

JidlaphJidlaph was the son of Nahor and Milcah.

JimnahJimnah or Jimna was a son of Asher according to Genesis 46:17 and Numbers 26:44. He was one of the 70 souls to migrate to Egypt with Jacob.

He is called Abinadab in 1 Chronicles 8:33 and 9:39.

 Joahaz 
For either of the biblical kings names Jehoahaz or Joahaz, see Jehoahaz of Israel or Jehoahaz of Judah.Joahaz, according 2 Chronicles 34:8, was the name of the father of Josiah's scribe Joah.

Joarib
See Jarib

Joash
This entry is about the four minor biblical characters named Joash. For the kings named Joash or Jehoash, see Jehoash of Israel and Jehoash of Judah.Joash, an abbreviated name of Jehoash, is the name of several figures in the Hebrew Bible.
 Joash, an Abiezrite of the Tribe of Manasseh, was the father of Gideon according to Judges 6–8. His family was poor and lived in Ophrah. After Gideon tore down the altar of Baal and cut down the grove, the men of Ophrah sought to kill Gideon. Joash stood against them, saying, "He that will plead for [Baal], let him be put to death whilst it is yet morning: if he be a god, let him plead for himself, because one hath cast down his altar."
 A Joash is described as "the king's son" in the time of Ahab. According to Stanley Arthur Cook, it is uncertain whether he was the son of king Ahab, or whether "king's son" was a title used high officers.
 Joash is described as one of the descendants of Shelah, son of Judah (son of Jacob) in a genealogy of the Tribe of Judah.
 A Joash is named as one of the Benjamite warriors to came to the aid of David when he went to Ziklag.

JobJob or Jashub was a son of Issachar according to Genesis 46:13, Numbers 26:24 and 1 Chronicles 7:1. He was one of the 70 souls to migrate to Egypt with Jacob.

JobabJobab is the name of at least five men in the Hebrew Bible.
 A son of Joktan according to Genesis 10:29 and 1 Chronicles 1:23.
 Jobab ben Zerah, a King of Edom according to Genesis 36:33 and 1 Chronicles 1:44.
 King of Madon, one of the kings who fought against Israel in Joshua 11.
 A son of Shaharaim and Hodesh according to 1 Chronicles 8:9.
 A son of Elpaal according to 1 Chronicles 8:18.

 Joed Joed is the name of a man mentioned in passing as being an ancestor of Sallu, a Benjamite in the time of Nehemiah.

JoelJoel is the name of several men in the Hebrew Bible:
 The firstborn son of the prophet Samuel. According to 1 Samuel chapter 8, Joel and his brother Abijah were appointed by Samuel to be judges in Beersheba, in the south of Israel, while he continued to judge in Ramah. However, Joel and Abijah "walked not in his ways, but turned aside after lucre, and took bribes, and perverted judgment", prompting the Israelites to demand that Samuel give them a king. Josephus says that "resigning his office to his sons, he divided the people between them, and placed them in Bethel and Beer-sheba", a statement which the Cambridge Bible for Schools and Colleges suggests "is probably his own conjecture".
 An ancestor of Samuel (mentioned in ).
 A Simeonite prince.
 A Reubenite; father of Shemaiah.
 A Gadite chief.
 A chief of Issachar.
 One of David's mighty men, indicated as the brother of Nathan.
 A Gershonite, a prince in the time of David (Chronicles ;).
 Son of Pedaiah; a Manassite chief in the time of David.
 A Kohathite in the time of Hezekiah.
 One of those who married foreign wives.
 Son of Zichri; a Benjamite overseer after the Exile.

 Joelah Joelah, in 1 Chronicles 12:7, is listed as one of the Benjamite warriors who went to David at Ziklag.

 Joezer Joezer, according to 1 Chronicles 12:6, is the name of one of the Benjamite warriors who came to the aid of David when he went to Ziklag in Philistine territory due to the hostility of king Saul.

JogliJogli was the father of Bukki, a prince of the Tribe of Dan. (Num. 34:22)

JohananJohanan (Hebrew: יוחנן "God is merciful") was the name of 7 biblical figures in the Hebrew Bible:

The son of Kareah was among the officers who survived the destruction of Jerusalem and exile of Judeans by the king of Babylon; he warned Gedaliah, the governor, of a plot to kill him, but was ignored.  Jeremiah 40 7ff.
The firstborn of King Josiah through Zebudah his wife. He is briefly mentioned in the Hebrew Bible only in the Book of 1 Chronicles. He could possibly be the same as Jehoahaz of Judah.
In , Johanan was a High Priest of Israel being the son of Azariah and the father of Azariah II at the time of King Solomon.
The High Priest Johanan the son of Joiada and father of Jaddua. Although somewhere in the Bible he is called as the son of Eliashib.

 Joiarib Joiarib ("God will contend") is the name of two biblical persons:
 Ancestor of Maaseiah the son of Barukh, who was one of those to resettle Jerusalem after the return from Babylonia.
 The head of a family of priests at the time of the return from Babylonia. He was one of the "men of understanding" sent by Ezra to Iddo in order to procure men to minister in the Temple. His son was Jedaiah, one of the priests to resettle Jerusalem. The head of the family at the time of Joiakim was Mattenai.

 Jokim Jokim is listed as one of the descendants of Shelah, son of Judah (son of Jacob) in 1 Chronicles 4:22.

Jonathan
Jonathan son of KareahJonathan (Hebrew: יונתן "God gave") son of Kareah was among the officers who survived the destruction of Jerusalem and exile of Judeans by the king of Babylon; he was brother to Johanan q.v. – Jeremiah 40:8

Josedech
See Jehozadok

Joseph
Joseph, father of IgalJoseph of the house of Issachar was the father of Igal, a scout sent to Canaan prior to the crossing of the Jordan River according to Numbers 13:7.

 Joshah Joshah son of Amaziah is mentioned only once in the Bible, where is listed among Benjamite leaders in 1 Chronicles 4:34. He is one of several clan leaders who, according to Chronicles, were involved in exterminating the descendants of Ham and the Meunim, and taking their pasture-lands.

 Joshaviah Joshaviah son of Elnaam is a biblical figure who appears only in 1 Chronicles 11:46, in a listing of David's Mighty Warriors.

 Joshbekashah Joshbekashah appears as one of the sons of Heman in a passage which describes the musicians of the Jerusalem Temple in the time of David.

 Joshibiah Joshibiah (King James Version spelling Josibiah) is given in 1 Chronicles 4:35 as the father of Jehu, one of the Benjamite clan leaders in the time of Hezekiah who exterminated the descendants of Ham and the Meunim and took their farmland.

Joshua
Joshua the BethshemiteJoshua the Bethshemite was the owner of the field in which the Ark of the Covenant came to rest when the Philistines sent it away on a driverless ox-drawn cart. (I Samuel 6:14)

Joshua the governor of the city
Joshua (Hebrew: יהושע yehoshua "God saves") was a city governor in the time of King Josiah of Judah.  II Kings 23:8

 Josibiah 
See Joshibiah.

 Josiphiah Josiphiah is a name which appears in a list of returnees from the Babylonian captivity, where "Shelomith son of Josiphiah" is listed as the leader of the 160 men of the "descendants of Bani" who returned to Yehud Medinata in the time of Nehemiah.

 Jozabad Jozabad is the name of several individuals mentioned in the Hebrew Bible. For three other individuals with a similar name, see Jehozabad.
 Jozabad of Gederah is listed as one of David's warriors in 1 Chronicles 12:4.
 Two men named Jozabad from the Tribe of Manasseh are listed as warriors of David in 1 Chronicles 12:20.
 Jozabad, according to 2 Chronicle 31:13, was an overseer in the Temple at Jerusalem in the time of Hezekiah.
 A Jozabad is described as a Levite leader in 2 Chronicles 35:9. This may be the same individual overseeing the Temple in the time of Hezekiah.
 Jozabad son of Joshua is listed as a Levite in the time of Ezra in the time of Ezra 8:33.
 A Levite Jozabad is listed in Ezra 10:22 as having taken a foreign wife.
 A Levite Jozabad is listed as having a foreign wife in Ezra 10:23. This man may be the same as Joshua son of Joshua mentioned above, and/or the same as the two individuals below.
 A Jozabad is listed in Nehemiah 8:7 as one of those who helped explain the law to the people of Yehud Medinata.
 A Jozabad is listed as one of the inhabitants of Jerusalem in Nehemiah 11:16.

JozacharJozachar (Hebrew: יוֹזָכָר, yozakhar, "God Remembered") or Jozacar, son of Shimeath, was one of the assassins of king Joash of Judah.  In 2 Kings 12:21 the Hebrew is יוזבד, yozabad.

 Jushab-hesed Jushab-hesed is a name which appears in the Hebrew Bible only in 1 Chronicles 3:20, where he is said to be one of the sons of Zerubbabel.

K

 Kallai Kallai is named as ancestral head of the priestly house of Sallai in the time of Jehoiakim, according to Nehemiah 12:20.

 Karshena 
See Carshena.

 Kelal Kelal or Chelal is a person listed in Ezra as among those who married foreign women.

 Kelita Kelita ("maiming") was a Levite who assisted Ezra in expounding the law to the people. He was also known as Kelaiah.

The KJV calls him Chesed instead of Kesed.

 Kemuel Kemuel Prince of the tribe of Ephraim; one of those appointed by Moses to superintend the division of Canaan amongst the tribe (Num. 34:24).

 Keren-happuch Keren-happuch, sometimes spelled Kerenhappuch, is the name of Job's third daughter who was born after prosperity had returned to him.

 Keziah Keziah ("Cassia") is the name of Job's second daughter.

Kimham
See Chimham

 Kolaiah Kolaiah ("voice of Jehovah") is the father of the false prophet Ahab. It is also the name of an ancestor of Sallu that settled in Jerusalem after returning from the Babylonian exile.

KoreKore' was responsible for distributing the freewill offerings of the Temple in the time of King Hezekiah.

See also 
 List of biblical names
 List of burial places of biblical figures
 List of major biblical figures
 List of minor biblical tribes

References 

 
Minor figures